= List of junior high schools in Tokyo =

This is a list of junior high schools in Tokyo Metropolis, Japan. The list includes public, national, private, and foreign government-operated junior high schools located within Tokyo's 23 special wards, West Tokyo (Tama area), and the Tokyo Islands (Izu Islands and Ogasawara Subprefecture).

In Japan, junior high school (中学校, chūgakkō) covers grades 7 through 9, typically for students aged 12 to 15, and is the final stage of compulsory education under Japan's School Education Law.

As of 2023, among public elementary school graduates in Tokyo, approximately 77.8% went on to attend public junior high schools, while 19.8% entered private junior high schools, and 0.4% enrolled in national schools. Public junior high schools in Tokyo are managed by local municipal boards of education, while the Tokyo Metropolitan Board of Education oversees metropolitan-level institutions.

The list also includes foreign government-operated and international junior high schools operating within Tokyo Metropolis.

== National ==
- Ochanomizu University Junior High School
- Tokyo Gakugei Koganei Junior High School
- Tokyo Gakugei Oizumi Junior High School
- Setagaya Junior High School attached to Tokyo Gakugei Univ.
- Takehaya Junior High School attached to Tokyo Gakugei Univ.
- Tokyo Gakugei University International Secondary School
- Junior and Senior High School at Otsuka, University of Tsukuba
- Junior and Senior High School at Komaba‚ University of Tsukuba
- Secondary School Attached to the Faculty of Education, the University of Tokyo

== Metropolitan ==
Operated by the Tokyo Metropolitan Board of Education

Six-year schools (which include junior high school):

- Koishikawa Secondary Education School
- Minamitama Secondary Education School (junior and senior high)
- Mitaka Secondary School (東京都立三鷹中等教育学校)
- Ōshūkan Secondary School
- Tachikawa Kokusai Secondary Education School

Junior high schools affiliated with senior high schools:

- Fuji High School and Junior High School
- Tokyo Metropolitan Hakuo Senior High School - Junior High School
- Tokyo Metropolitan Musashi Senior High School & Junior High School
- Tokyo Metropolitan Oizumi High School and Junior High School
- Ryogoku High School and Junior High School

== Municipal ==
=== 23 Wards ===
==== Adachi ====
Combined elementary and junior high schools:

- Okimoto Ogi Gakuen (興本扇学園)
- Shinden Gakuen (新田学園)

Junior high schools:

- No. 1 Junior High School (第一中学校)
- No. 4 Junior High School (第四中学校)
- No. 5 Junior High School (第五中学校)
- No. 6 Junior High School (第六中学校)
- No. 7 Junior High School (第七中学校)
- No. 9 Junior High School (第九中学校)
- No. 10 Junior High School (第十中学校)
- No. 11 Junior High School (第十一中学校)
- No. 12 Junior High School (第十二中学校)
- No. 13 Junior High School (第十三中学校)
- No. 14 Junior High School (第十四中学校)
- Aoi Junior High School (青井中学校)
- Fuchie Junior High School (渕江中学校)
- Hanahata Junior High School (花畑中学校)
- Hanahata Kita Junior High School (花畑北中学校)
- Hanaho Junior High School (花保中学校)
- Higashi Ayase Junior High School (東綾瀬中学校)
- Higashi Shimane Junior High School (東島根中学校)
- Iko Junior High School (伊興中学校)
- Iriya Junior High School (入谷中学校)
- Iriyaminami Junior High School (入谷南中学校)
- Kaga Junior High School (加賀中学校)
- Kanbara Junior High School (蒲原中学校)
- Kohoku Sakura Junior High School (江北桜中学校)
- Konan Junior High School (江南中学校)
- Kurishima Junior High School (栗島中学校)
- Nishi Arai Junior High School (西新井中学校)
- Rokugatsu Junior High School (六月中学校)
- Senju Aoba Junior High School (千寿青葉中学校)
- Senju Sakuratsumi Junior High School (千寿桜堤中学校)
- Shikahama Nanohana Junior High School (鹿浜菜の花中学校)
- Takenozuka Junior High School (竹の塚中学校)
- Yanaka Junior High School (谷中中学校)

==== Arakawa ====
- No. 1 Junior High School (第一中学校)
- No. 3 Junior High School (第三中学校)
- No. 4 Junior High School (第四中学校)
- No. 5 Junior High School (第五中学校)
- No. 7 Junior High School (第七中学校)
- No. 9 Junior High School (第九中学校)
- Hara Junior High School (原中学校)
- Minamisenju No. 2 Junior High School (南千住第二中学校)
- Ogu Hachiman Junior High School (尾久八幡中学校)
- Suwadai Junior High School (諏訪台中学校)

==== Bunkyo ====
- No. 1 Junior High School (第一中学校)
- No. 3 Junior High School (第三中学校)
- No. 6 Junior High School (第六中学校)
- No. 8 Junior High School (第八中学校)
- No. 9 Junior High School (第九中学校)
- No. 10 Junior High School (第十中学校)
- Bunrin Junior High School (文林中学校)
- Hongodai Junior High School (本郷台中学校)
- Meidai Junior High School (茗台中学校)
- Otowa Junior High School (音羽中学校)

==== Chiyoda ====
- Kudan Secondary School - Junior high school division - Kudankita
- Kōjimachi Junior High School (麹町中学校) - Hirakawachō
- Kanda-Hitotsubashi Junior High School (神田一橋中学校) - Hitotsubashi

==== Chuo ====
- Ginza Junior High School (銀座中学校)
- Harumi Junior High School (晴海中学校)
- Nihonbashi Junior High School (日本橋中学校)
- Tsukuda Junior High School (佃中学校)

==== Edogawa ====
- Harue Junior High School (春江中学校)
- Higashi Kasai Junior High School (東葛西中学校)
- Kamiishiki Junior High School (上一色中学校)
- Kasai Junior High School (葛西中学校)
- Kasai No. 2 Junior High School (葛西第二中学校)
- Kasai No. 3 Junior High School (葛西第三中学校)
- Koiwa No. 1 Junior High School (小岩第一中学校)
- Koiwa No. 2 Junior High School (小岩第二中学校)
- Koiwa No. 3 Junior High School (小岩第三中学校)
- Koiwa No. 4 Junior High School (小岩第四中学校)
- Koiwa No. 5 Junior High School (小岩第五中学校)
- Komagatsukawa No. 1 Junior High School (小松川第一中学校)
- Komagatsukawa No. 2 Junior High School (小松川第二中学校)
- Komagatsukawa No. 3 Junior High School (小松川第三中学校)
- Matsue No. 1 Junior High School (松江第一中学校)
- Matsue No. 2 Junior High School (松江第二中学校)
- Matsue No. 3 Junior High School (松江第三中学校)
- Matsue No. 4 Junior High School (松江第四中学校)
- Matsue No. 5 Junior High School (松江第五中学校)
- Matsue No. 6 Junior High School (松江第六中学校)
- Minami Kasai Junior High School (南葛西中学校)
- Minami Kasai No. 2 Junior High School (南葛西第二中学校)
- Mizue Junior High School (瑞江中学校)
- Mizue No. 2 Junior High School (瑞江第二中学校)
- Mizue No. 3 Junior High School (瑞江第三中学校)
- Ninoe Junior High School (二之江中学校)
- Nishi Kasai Junior High School (西葛西中学校)
- Seishin No. 1 Junior High School (清新第一中学校)
- Seishin No. 2 Junior High School (清新第二中学校)
- Shikamoto Junior High School (鹿本中学校)
- Shinozaki Junior High School (篠崎中学校)
- Shinozaki No. 2 Junior High School (篠崎第二中学校)
- Shishibone Junior High School (鹿骨中学校)

==== Itabashi ====
- Akatsuka No. 1 Junior High School (赤塚第一中学校)
- Akatsuka No. 2 Junior High School (赤塚第二中学校)
- Akatsuka No. 3 Junior High School (赤塚第三中学校)
- Itabashi No. 1 Junior High School (板橋第一中学校)
- Itabashi No. 2 Junior High School (板橋第二中学校)
- Itabashi No. 3 Junior High School (板橋第三中学校)
- Itabashi No. 5 Junior High School (板橋第五中学校)
- Kaga Junior High School (加賀中学校)
- Kami Itabashi No. 1 Junior High School (上板橋第一中学校)
- Kami Itabashi No. 2 Junior High School (上板橋第二中学校)
- Kami Itabashi No. 3 Junior High School (上板橋第三中学校)
- Nakadai Junior High School (中台中学校)
- Nishidai Junior High School (西台中学校)
- Sakuragawa Junior High School (桜川中学校)
- Shimura No. 1 Junior High School (志村第一中学校)
- Shimura No. 2 Junior High School (志村第二中学校)
- Shimura No. 3 Junior High School (志村第三中学校)
- Shimura No. 4 Junior High School (志村第四中学校)
- Shimura No. 5 Junior High School (志村第五中学校)
- Takashima No. 1 Junior High School (高島第一中学校)
- Takashima No. 2 Junior High School (高島第二中学校)
- Takashima No. 3 Junior High School (高島第三中学校)

==== Katsushika ====
- Aoba Junior High School (青葉中学校)
- Aoto Junior High School (青戸中学校)
- Ayase Junior High School (綾瀬中学校)
- Daido Junior High School (大道中学校)
- Futaba Junior High School (双葉中学校)
- Higashi (East) Kanamachi Junior High School (東金町中学校)
- Honda Junior High School (本田中学校)
- Horikiri Junior High School (堀切中学校)
- Ichinodai Junior High School (一之台中学校)
- Kamihirai Junior High School (上平井中学校)
- Kameari Junior High School (亀有中学校)
- Kanamachi Junior High School (金町中学校)
- Katsumi Junior High School (葛美中学校)
- Komatsu Junior High School (小松中学校)
- Mizumoto Junior High School (水元中学校)
- Nakagawa Junior High School (中川中学校)
- Nijuku Junior High School (新宿中学校)
- Okudo Junior High School (奥戸中学校)
- Sakuramichi Junior High School (桜道中学校)
- Shinkoiwa Junior High School (新小岩中学校)
- Takasago Junior High School (高砂中学校)
- Tateishi Junior High School (立石中学校)
- Tokiwa Junior High School (常盤中学校)
- Yotsugi Junior High School (四ツ木中学校)

==== Kita ====
- Akabane Iwabuchi Junior High School (赤羽岩淵中学校)
- Asuka Junior High School (飛鳥中学校)
- Horifune Junior High School (堀船中学校)
- Inatsuke Junior High School (稲付中学校)
- Jujo Fujimi Junior High School (北区立十条富士見中学校)
- Kamiya Junior High School (神谷中学校)
- Kirigaoka Junior High School (桐ケ丘中学校)
- Meio Junior High School (明桜中学校)
- Ouji Sakura Junior High School (王子桜中学校)
- Tabata Junior High School (田端中学校)
- Takinogawa Koyo Junior High School (滝野川紅葉中学校)
- Ukima Junior High School (浮間中学校)

Former junior high schools:

- Akabane Junior High School (赤羽中学校)
- Fujimi Junior High School (富士見中学校)
- Iwabuchi Junior High School (岩淵中学校)
- Jujo Junior High School (十条中学校)
- Koyo Junior High School (紅葉中学校)
- Shinmachi Junior High School (新町中学校)
- Takinogawa Junior High School (滝野川中学校)

==== Koto ====
Combined junior and senior high schools:

- Ariake Nishi Gakuen (有明西学園)

Junior high schools:

- No. 2 Kameido Junior High School (第二亀戸中学校)
- No. 2 Minamisuna Junior High School (第二南砂中学校)
- No. 2 Ojima Junior High School (第二大島中学校)
- No. 2 Sunamachi Junior High School (第二砂町中学校)
- No. 3 Kameido Junior High School (第三亀戸中学校)
- No. 3 Sunamachi Junior High School (第三砂町中学校)
- No. 4 Sunamachi Junior High School (第四砂町中学校)
- Ariake Junior High School (有明中学校)
- Fukagawa No. 1 Junior High School (深川第一中学校)
- Fukagawa No. 2 Junior High School (深川第二中学校)
- Fukagawa No. 3 Junior High School (深川第三中学校)
- Fukagawa No. 4 Junior High School (深川第四中学校)
- Fukagawa No. 5 Junior High School (深川第五中学校)
- Fukagawa No. 6 Junior High School (深川第六中学校)
- Fukagawa No. 7 Junior High School (深川第七中学校)
- Fukagawa No. 8 Junior High School (深川第八中学校)
- Kameido Junior High School (亀戸中学校)
- Ojima Junior High School (大島中学校)
- Ojima Nishi Junior High School (大島西中学校)
- Minamisuna Junior High School (南砂中学校)
- Sunamachi Junior High School (砂町中学校)
- Tatsumi Junior High School (辰巳中学校)
- Toyo Junior High School (東陽中学校)

==== Meguro ====
- Meguro 1st Junior High School (第一中学校)
- Meguro 7th Junior High School (第七中学校)
- Meguro 8th Junior High School (第八中学校)
- Meguro 9th Junior High School (第九中学校)
- Meguro 10th Junior High School (第十中学校)
- Meguro 11th Junior High School (第十一中学校)
- Higashiyama Junior High School (東山中学校)
- Meguro Chuo Junior High School (目黒中央中学校)
- Otori Junior High School (大鳥中学校)

==== Minato ====
Combined elementary and junior high schools:

- Odaiba Gakuen (お台場学園)
- Shirokane-no-oka Gakuen (白金の丘学園)

Junior high schools:

- Akasaka Junior High School (赤坂中学校)
- Aoyama Junior High School (青山中学校)
- Konan Junior High School (港南中学校)
- Koryo Junior High School (高陵中学校)
- Mita Junior High School (三田中学校) opened in 2001 after the merger of Minato Junior High School and Shibahama Junior High School.
- Onarimon Junior High School (御成門中学校)
- Roppongi Junior High School (六本木中学校)
- Takamatsu Junior High School (高松中学校)

Former schools:

- Asahi Junior High School (朝日中学校)

==== Nerima ====
Combined elementary and junior high schools:

- Oizumi Sakura Gakuen (小中一貫教育校大泉桜学園)

Junior high schools:

- Asahigaoka Junior High School (旭丘中学校)
- Hikarigaoka No. 1 Junior High School (光が丘第一中学校)
- Hikarigaoka No. 2 Junior High School (光が丘第二中学校)
- Hikarigaoka No. 3 Junior High School (光が丘第三中学校)
- Hokei Junior High School (豊渓中学校)
- Kaishin No. 1 Junior High School (開進第一中学校)
- Kaishin No. 2 Junior High School (開進第二中学校)
- Kaishin No. 3 Junior High School (開進第三中学校)
- Kaishin No. 4 Junior High School (開進第四中学校)
- Kami Shakujii Junior High School (上石神井中学校)
- Kitamachi Junior High School (北町中学校)
- Miharadai Junior High School (三原台中学校)
- Minamigaoka Junior High School (南が丘中学校)
- Nakamura Junior High School (中村中学校)
- Nerima Junior High School (練馬中学校)
- Nerima Higashi Junior High School (練馬東中学校)
- Nukui Junior High School (貫井中学校)
- Oizumi Junior High School (大泉中学校)
- Oizumi No. 2 Junior High School (大泉第二中学校)
- Oizumi Gakuen Junior High School (大泉学園中学校)
- Oizumi Kita Junior High School (大泉北中学校)
- Oizumi Nishi Junior High School (大泉西中学校)
- Seki Junior High School (関中学校)
- Shakujii Junior High School (石神井中学校)
- Shakujii Higashi Junior High School (石神井東中学校)
- Shakujii Minami Junior High School (石神井南中学校)
- Shakujii Nishi Junior High School (石神井西中学校)
- Tagara Junior High School (田柄中学校)
- Toyotama Junior High School (豊玉中学校)
- Toyotama No. 2 Junior High School (豊玉第二中学校)
- Yahara Junior High School (谷原中学校)
- Yasaka Junior High School (八坂中学校)

==== Nakano ====
- No. 2 Junior High School (第二中学校)
- No. 5 Junior High School (第五中学校)
- No. 7 Junior High School (第七中学校)
- Kita Nakano Junior High School (北中野中学校)
- Meiwa Junior High School (明和中学校)
  - Merger of No. 4 Junior High School (第四中学校) and No. 8 Junior High School (第八中学校).
- Midorino Junior High School (緑野中学校)
- Minami Nakano Junior High School (南中野中学校)
- Nakano Junior High School (中野中学校)
- Nakano Higashi Junior High School (中野東中学校)
  - Merger of No. 3 Junior High School (第三中学校) and No. 10 Junior High School (第十中学校).

==== Ota ====
- Den en Chofu Junior High School (田園調布中学校)
- Haneda Junior High School (羽田中学校)
- Hasunuma Junior High School (蓮沼中学校)
- Higashi Chofu Junior High School (東調布中学校)
- Ishikawadai Junior High School (石川台中学校)
- Izumo Junior High School (出雲中学校)
- Kaizuka Junior High School (貝塚中学校)
- Kamata Junior High School (蒲田中学校)
- Kojiya Junior High School (糀谷中学校)
- Magome Junior High School (馬込中学校)
- Magome Higashi Junior High School (馬込東中学校)
- Minami Rokugo Junior High School (南六郷中学校)
- Misono Junior High School (御園中学校)
- Omori No. 1 Junior High School (大森第一中学校)
- Omori No. 2 Junior High School (大森第二中学校)
- Omori No. 3 Junior High School (大森第三中学校)
- Omori No. 4 Junior High School (大森第四中学校)
- Omori No. 6 Junior High School (大森第六中学校)
- Omori No. 7 Junior High School (大森第七中学校)
- Omori No. 8 Junior High School (大森第八中学校)
- Omori No. 10 Junior High School (大森第十中学校)
- Omori Higashi Junior High School (大森東中学校)
- Rokugo Junior High School (六郷中学校)
- Shimoda Junior High School (志茂田中学校)
- Toho Junior High School (東蒲中学校)
- Yaguchi Junior High School (矢口中学校)
- Yasukata Junior High School (安方中学校)
- Yukigaya Junior High School (雪谷中学校)

==== Setagaya ====
They are:

- Chitose Junior High School (千歳中学校)
- Fuji Junior High School (富士中学校)
- Fukasawa Junior High School (深沢中学校)
- Funabashi Kibo Junior High School (船橋希望中学校)
- Higashi Fukasawa Junior High School (東深沢中学校)
- Kamisoshigaya Junior High School (上祖師谷中学校)
- Karasuyama Junior High School (烏山中学校)
- Kinuta Junior High School (砧中学校)
- Kinuta Minami Junior High School (砧南中学校)
- Kitami Junior High School (喜多見中学校)
- Kitazawa Junior High School (北沢中学校)
- Komadome Junior High School (駒留中学校)
- Komazawa Junior High School (駒沢中学校)
- Matsuzawa Junior High School (松沢中学校)
- Midorigaoka Junior High School (緑丘中学校)
- Mishuku Junior High School (三宿中学校)
- Osukawa Junior High School (奥沢中学校)
- Oyamadai Junior High School (尾山台中学校)
- Roka Junior High School (芦花中学校)
- Sakuragaoka Junior High School (桜丘中学校)
- Sakuragi Junior High School (桜木中学校)
- Seta Junior High School (瀬田中学校)
- Setagaya Junior High School (世田谷中学校)
- Taishido Junior High School (太子堂中学校)
- Tamagawa Junior High School (玉川中学校)
- Tsurumaki Junior High School (弦巻中学校)
- Umegaoka Junior High School (梅丘中学校)
- Yahata Junior High School (八幡中学校)
- Yoga Junior High School (用賀中学校)

Former schools:

- Funabashi Junior High School (船橋中学校)
- Ikejiri Junior High School (池尻中学校)
- Kibogaoka Junior High School (希望丘中学校)
- Wakabayashi Junior High School (若林中学校)
- Yamazaki Junior High School (山崎中学校)

==== Shibuya ====
Public combined elementary and junior high schools

- Shibuya Honmachi Gakuen (渋谷本町学園)

Junior high schools:

- Hachiyama Junior High School (鉢山中学校)
- Harajuku Gaien Junior High School (原宿外苑中学校)
- Hiroo Junior High School (広尾中学校)
- Sasazuka Junior High School (笹塚中学校)
- Shoto Junior High School (松濤中学校)
- Uehara Junior High School (上原中学校)
- Yoyogi Junior High School (代々木中学校)

==== Shinagawa ====
Municipal combined elementary and junior high schools:

- Ebara Hiratsuka Gakuen (荏原平塚学園)
- Hino Gakuen (日野学園)
- Houyou no Mori Gakuen (豊葉の杜学園)
- Ito Gakuen (伊藤学園)
- Shinagawa Gakuen (品川学園)
- Yashio Gakuen (八潮学園)

Municipal junior high schools:

- Ebara No. 1 Junior High School (荏原第一中学校)
- Ebara No. 5 Junior High School (荏原第五中学校)
- Ebara No. 6 Junior High School (荏原第六中学校)
- Fujimidai Junior High School (冨士見台中学校)
- Hamakawa Junior High School (浜川中学校)
- Osaki Junior High School (大崎中学校)
- Suzugamori Junior High School (鈴ヶ森中学校)
- Togoshidai Junior High School (戸越台中学校)
- Tokai Junior High School (東海中学校)

==== Shinjuku ====
- Nishishinjuku Junior High School (西新宿中学校)
- Nishitoyama Junior High School (新宿西戸山中学校)
- Nishiwaseda Junior High School (西早稲田中学校)
- Ochiai Junior High School (落合中学校)
- Ochiai No. 2 Junior High School (落合第二中学校)
- Shinjuku Junior High School (新宿中学校)
- Ushigome No. 1 Junior High School (牛込第一中学校)
- Ushigome No. 2 Junior High School (牛込第二中学校)
- Ushigome No. 3 Junior High School (牛込第三中学校)
- Yotsuya Junior High School (四谷中学校)

==== Suginami ====
Municipal combined elementary and junior high schools:

- Koenji Gakuen (高円寺学園)
- Suginami Izumi Gakuen (杉並和泉学園)

Municipal junior high schools:

- Amanuma Junior High School (天沼中学校)
- Asagaya Junior High School (阿佐ヶ谷中学校)
- Fujimigaoka Junior High School (富士見丘中学校)
- Higashida Junior High School (東田中学校)
- Higashihara Junior High School (東原中学校)
- Igusa Junior High School (井草中学校)
- Iogi Junior High School (井荻中学校)
- Konan Junior High School (高南中学校)
- Koyo Junior High School (向陽中学校)
- Matsunoki Junior High School (松ノ木中学校)
- Miyamae Junior High School (宮前中学校)
- Nakase Junior High School (中瀬中学校)
- Nishimiya Junior High School (西宮中学校)
- Ogikubo Junior High School (荻窪中学校)
- Omiya Junior High School (大宮中学校)
- Sen-nan Junior High School (泉南中学校)
- Shinmei Junior High School (神明中学校)
- Shokei Junior High School (松溪中学校)
- Sugimori Junior High School (杉森中学校)
- Takaido Junior High School (高井戸中学校)
- Wada Junior High School (和田中学校)

==== Sumida ====
- Azumadaini ("Azuma No. 2") Junior High School (吾嬬第二中学校)
- Azumamatchibana Junior High School (吾嬬立花中学校)
- Bunka Junior High School (文花中学校)
- Honjyo Junior High School (本所中学校)
- Kinshi Junior High School (錦糸中学校)
- Ryogoku Junior High School (両国中学校)
- Sakuratsutsumi Junior High School (桜堤中学校)
- Sumida Junior High School (墨田中学校)
- Tatekawa Junior High School (竪川中学校)
- Terashima Junior High School (寺島中学校)

==== Taito ====
- Asakusa Junior High School (浅草中学校)
- Hakuyo Junior High School (柏葉中学校)
- Komagata Junior High School (駒形中学校)
- Okachimachi Taito Junior High School (御徒町台東中学校)
- Sakurabashi Junior High School (台東区立桜橋中学校)
- Shinobugaoka Junior High School (忍岡中学校)
- Ueno Junior High School (上野中学校)

==== Toshima ====
- Chitosebashi Junior High School (千登世橋中学校)
- Ikebukuro Junior High School (池袋中学校)
- Komagome Junior High School (駒込中学校)
- Meiho Junior High School (明豊中学校)
- Nishiikebukuro Junior High School (西池袋中学校)
- Nishisugamo Junior High School (西巣鴨中学校)
- Senkawa Junior High School (千川中学校)
- Sugamokita Junior High School (巣鴨北中学校)

=== West Tokyo ===
==== Akiruno ====
- Akita (秋多中学校)
- Higashi (東中学校)
- Itsukaichi (五日市中学校)
- Masuko (増戸中学校)
- Mido (御堂中学校)
- Nishi (西中学校)

==== Akishima ====
- Fukujima Junior High School (福島中学校)
- Haijima Junior High School (拝島中学校)
- Seisen Junior High School (清泉中学校)
- Showa Junior High School (昭和中学校)
- Tamabe Junior High School (多摩辺中学校)
- Zuiun Junior High School (瑞雲中学校)

==== Chofu ====
- Chofu Junior High School (調布中学校)
- Jindai Junior High School (神代中学校)
- No. 3 Junior High School (第三中学校)
- No. 4 Junior High School (第四中学校)
- No. 5 Junior High School (第五中学校)
- No. 6 Junior High School (第六中学校)
- No. 7 Junior High School (第七中学校)
- No. 8 Junior High School (第八中学校)

==== Fuchu ====
- Fuchu No. 1 (府中第一中学校)
- Fuchu No. 2 (府中第二中学校)
- Fuchu No. 3 (府中第三中学校)
- Fuchu No. 4 (府中第四中学校)
- Fuchu No. 5 (府中第五中学校)
- Fuchu No. 6 (府中第六中学校)
- Fuchu No. 7 (府中第七中学校)
- Fuchu No. 8 (府中第八中学校)
- Fuchu No. 9 (府中第九中学校)
- Fuchu No. 10 (府中第十中学校)
- Sengen (浅間中学校)

==== Fussa ====
- Fussa No. 1 (福生第一中学校)
- Fussa No. 2 (福生第二中学校)
- Fussa No. 3 (福生第三中学校)

==== Hachioji ====
Combined public elementary and junior high schools:

- Izumi no Mori School (いずみの森義務教育学校)
- Tate (館小中学校)

Public junior high schools:

- No. 1 (第一中学校)
- No. 2 (第二中学校)
- No. 4 (第四中学校)
- No. 6 (第六中学校)
- No. 7 (第七中学校)
- Asakawa (浅川中学校)
- Bessho (別所中学校)
- Hiyodoriyama (ひよどり山中学校)
- Ishikawa (石川中学校)
- Kamiyugi (上柚木中学校)
- Kasumi (加住中学校)
- Kawaguchi (川口中学校)
- Konobara (甲ノ原中学校)
- Kunigida (椚田中学校)
- Matsugaya (松が谷中学校)
- Matsugi (松木中学校)
- Minamino (みなみ野中学校)
- Minamiosawa (南大沢中学校)
- Miyagami (宮上中学校)
- Moto Hachioji (元八王子中学校)
- Nagabusa (長房中学校)
- Nakayama (中山中学校)
- Nanakuni (七国中学校)
- Narahara (楢原中学校)
- Ongata (恩方中学校)
- Ryonan (陵南中学校)
- Shiroyama (城山中学校)
- Uchikoshi (打越中学校)
- Yarimizu (鑓水中学校)
- Yokokawa (横川中学校)
- Yokoyama (横山中学校)
- Yotsuya (四谷中学校)
- Yugi (由木中学校)
- Yui (由井中学校)

Former:

- Takaosan Gakuen (高尾山学園) - Elementary and junior high

==== Hamura ====
- Hamura No. 1 (羽村第一中学校)
- Hamura No. 2 (羽村第二中学校)
- Hamura No. 3 (羽村第三中学校)

==== Higashikurume ====
- Chuo (中央中学校)
- Daimon (大門中学校)
- Higashi (東中学校)
- Kurume (久留米中学校)
- Minami (南中学校)
- Nishi (西中学校)
- Shimosato (下里中学校)

==== Higashimurayama ====
- Higashimurayama No. 1 (東村山第一中学校)
- Higashimurayama No. 2 (東村山第二中学校)
- Higashimurayama No. 3 (東村山第三中学校)
- Higashimurayama No. 4 (東村山第四中学校)
- Higashimurayama No. 5 (東村山第五中学校)
- Higashimurayama No. 6 (東村山第六中学校)
- Higashimurayama No. 7 (東村山第七中学校)

==== Higashiyamato ====
- No. 1 (第一中学校)
- No. 2 (第二中学校)
- No. 3 (第三中学校)
- No. 4 (第四中学校)
- No. 5 (第五中学校)

==== Hino ====
- Hino No. 1 (日野第一中学校)
- Hino No. 2 (日野第二中学校)
- Hino No. 3 (日野第三中学校)
- Hino No. 4 (日野第四中学校)
- Hirayama (平山中学校)
- Misawa (三沢中学校)
- Nanao (七生中学校)
- Ohsakaue (大坂上中学校)

==== Hinode ====
- Hirai Junior High School (平井中学校)
- Oguno Junior High School (大久野中学校)

==== Hinohara ====
- Hinohara Junior High School (檜原中学校)

==== Inagi ====
- Inagi No. 1 (稲城第一中学校)
- Inagi No. 2 (稲城第二中学校)
- Inagi No. 3 (稲城第三中学校)
- Inagi No. 4 (稲城第四中学校)
- Inagi No. 5 (稲城第五中学校)
- Inagi No. 6 (稲城第六中学校)

==== Kiyose ====
- Kiyose (清瀬中学校)
- Kiyose No. 2 (清瀬第二中学校)
- Kiyose No. 3 (清瀬第三中学校)
- Kiyose No. 4 (清瀬第四中学校)
- Kiyose No. 5 (清瀬第五中学校)

==== Kodaira ====
- Hana Koganei Minami (花小金井南中学校)
- Josui (上水中学校)
- Kodaira No. 1 (小平第一中学校)
- Kodaira No. 2 (小平第二中学校)
- Kodaira No. 3 (小平第三中学校)
- Kodaira No. 4 (小平第四中学校)
- Kodaira No. 5 (小平第五中学校)
- Kodaira No. 6 (小平第六中学校)

==== Koganei ====
- Higashi (東中学校)
- Koganei No. 1 (小金井第一中学校)
- Koganei No. 2 (小金井第二中学校)
- Midori (緑中学校)
- Minami (南中学校)

==== Kokubunji ====
- No. 1 (第一中学校)
- No. 2 (第二中学校)
- No. 3 (第三中学校)
- No. 4 (第四中学校)
- No. 5 (第五中学校)

==== Komae ====
- Komae No. 1 (狛江第一中学校)
- Komae No. 2 (狛江第二中学校)
- Komae No. 3 (狛江第三中学校)
- Komae No. 4 (狛江第四中学校)

==== Kunitachi ====
- Kunitachi No. 1 (国立第一中学校)
- Kunitachi No. 2 (国立第二中学校)
- Kunitachi No. 3 (国立第三中学校)

==== Machida ====
Combined municipal elementary and junior high schools:

- Yukinoki Gakuen (ゆくのき学園) - For junior high, it occupies Musashigaoka Junior High School (武蔵岡中学校)

Municipal junior high schools:

- Kanai (金井中学校)
- Kiso (木曽中学校)
- Machida No. 1 (町田第一中学校)
- Machida No. 2 (町田第二中学校)
- Machida No. 3 (町田第三中学校)
- Minami (南中学校)
- Minaminaruse (南成瀬中学校)
- Minamiotani (南大谷中学校)
- Narusedai (成瀬台中学校)
- Oyama (小山中学校)
- Oyamada (小山田中学校)
- Sakai (堺中学校)
- Shinkoji (真光寺中学校)
- Tadao (忠生中学校)
- Tsukushino (つくし野中学校)
- Tsurukawa (鶴川中学校)
- Tsurukawa No. 2 (鶴川第二中学校)
- Yakushi (薬師中学校)
- Yamasaki (山崎中学校)

==== Mitaka ====
- No. 1 Junior High School (第一中学校)
- No. 2 Junior High School (第二中学校)
- No. 3 Junior High School (第三中学校)
- No. 4 Junior High School (第四中学校)
- No. 5 Junior High School (第五中学校)
- No. 6 Junior High School (第六中学校)
- No. 7 Junior High School (第七中学校)

==== Mizuho ====
- Mizuho Junior High School (瑞穂中学校)
- Mizuho Second Junior High School (瑞穂第二中学校)

==== Musashimurayama ====
Municipal combined elementary and junior high schools:

- Dainan Gakuen (大南学園) - No. 7 Elementary School (第七小学校) and No. 4 Junior High School (第四中学校)
- Murayama Gakuen (村山学園)

Municipal junior high schools:

- No. 1 (第一中学校)
- No. 3 (第三中学校)
- No. 5 (第五中学校)

==== Musashino ====
- No. 1 Junior High School (第一中学校)
- No. 2 Junior High School (第二中学校)
- No. 3 Junior High School (第三中学校)
- No. 4 Junior High School (第四中学校)
- No. 5 Junior High School (第五中学校)
- No. 6 Junior High School (第六中学校)

==== Nishitokyo ====
- Hibarigaoka (ひばりが丘中学校)
- Houya (保谷中学校)
- Meihou (明保中学校)
- Seiran (青嵐中学校)
- Tanashi No. 1 (田無第一中学校)
- Tanashi No. 2 (田無第二中学校)
- Tanashi No. 3 (田無第三中学校)
- Tanashi No. 4 (田無第四中学校)
- Yagisawa (柳沢中学校)

==== Okutama ====
- Okutama Junior High School (奥多摩中学校)

Okutama JHS was formed by the merger of Hikawa JHS (氷川中学校) and Kori JHS (古里中学校) in 2015.

==== Ome ====
- No. 1 (第一中学校)
- No. 2 (第二中学校)
- No. 3 (第三中学校)
- No. 6 (第六中学校)
- No. 7 (第七中学校)
- Fukiage (吹上中学校)
- Higashi (東中学校)
- Izumi (泉中学校)
- Kasumidai (霞台中学校)
- Nishi (西中学校)
- Shinmachi (新町中学校)

==== Tachikawa ====
- Tachikawa No. 1 (立川第一中学校)
- Tachikawa No. 2 (立川第二中学校)
- Tachikawa No. 3 (立川第三中学校)
- Tachikawa No. 4 (立川第四中学校)
- Tachikawa No. 5 (立川第五中学校)
- Tachikawa No. 6 (立川第六中学校)
- Tachikawa No. 7 (立川第七中学校)
- Tachikawa No. 8 (立川第八中学校)
- Tachikawa No. 9 (立川第九中学校)

==== Tama ====
- Higashi Atago (東愛宕中学校)
- Hijirigaoka (聖ヶ丘中学校)
- Ochiai (落合中学校)
- Seiryo (青陵中学校)
- Suwa (諏訪中学校)
- Tama (多摩中学校)
- Tama Nagayama (多摩永山中学校)
- Tsurumaki (鶴牧中学校)
- Wada (和田中学校)

=== Islands ===
Aogashima

- Aogashima Elementary-Junior High School (青ヶ島村立青ヶ島小中学校)

Hachijo

- Fuji Junior High School (富士中学校)
- Mihara Junior High School (三原中学校)
- Okago Junior High School (大賀郷中学校)

Kozushima

- Kozushima Junior High School (神津島村立神津中学校)

Mikurajima

- Mikurajima Elementary and Junior High School (御蔵島小中学校)

Miyake

- Miyake Junior High School (村立三宅中学校)

Niijima

- Niijima Junior High School (新島中学校)
- Shikinejima Junior High School (式根島中学校)

Ogasawara

- Ogasawara Village Municipal Ogasawara Junior High School (小笠原村立小笠原中学校) in Chichi-jima
- Ogasawara Village Municipal Haha-jima Elementary School and Junior High School (小笠原村立母島小中学校) on Haha-jima

Oshima

- Dai-ichi (No. 1 or First) (大島町立第一中学校)
- Daini (No. 2 or Second) (大島町立第二中学校)
- Daisan (No. 3 or Third) (大島町立第三中学校)

To-shima

- Toshima Elementary and Junior High School (利島村立利島小中学校)

== Foreign government-operated ==
- Russian Embassy School in Tokyo
- Yokota Middle School (DoDEA)

== Private ==
- Adachi Gakuen Junior and Senior High School
- American School in Japan (Junior high school division)
- Aoba-Japan International School (Junior high school division)
- Azabu Junior & Senior High School
- British School of Tokyo (Secondary school division)
- The Junior High and Senior High School affiliated to the Bunkyo University
- Canadian International School (Junior high school division)
- Tokyo Chinese School (Junior high school division)
- Chiyoda Jo-Gakuen Junior and Senior High School
- Christian Academy in Japan (Junior high school division)
- Chuo University Junior and High School
- Dalton Tokyo Junior & Senior High School
- Edogawa Girls' Junior & High School
- Lycée Français International de Tokyo (Junior high school division)
- Futaba Gakuen Junior and Senior High School
- Fujimi Junior & Senior High School
- Fujimura Girls' Junior and Senior High School
- Gakushuin Boys' Junior and Senior High School
- Gakushuin Girls' Junior and Senior High School
- Global Indian International School, Tokyo Campus (Junior high school division)
- Gyosei Junior and Senior High School
- Hosei University Junior and Senior High School
- Hosen Gakuen Junior and Senior High School - Has coeducational and girls' only sections
- International School of the Sacred Heart (Junior high school division)
- Jissen Gakuen Junior and Senior High School
- Jiyu Gakuen - Separate junior-senior high schools for female and male students
- Joshigakuin Junior and Senior High School
- Joshi Seigakuin Junior & Senior High School
- Junten Junior High School Junten Senior High School
- Kunimoto Alberta International School
- K. International School Tokyo (Junior high school division)
- Kaetsu Ariake Junior and Senior High School
- Kaisei Junior & Senior High School
- Kanda Jo-Gakuen Junior and Senior High School
- Keimei Gakuen
- Kichijo Girls' School (Junior and senior high school)
- Kogyokusha Junior High and Senior High School
- Koka Gakuen Junior & Senior High School for Girls
- Komazawa Gakuen Girls' Junior High School-Senior High School
- Tokyo Korean School (Elementary division)
- Tokyo Korean Junior and Senior High School
- Tokyo Korean 1st Elementary and Junior High School (東京朝鮮第一初中級学校)
- Tokyo Korean 4th Elementary and Junior High School (東京朝鮮第四初中級学校)
- Tokyo Korean 5th Elementary and Junior High School (東京朝鮮第五初中級学校)
- West Tokyo Korean No. 1. Elementary and Junior High School (西東京朝鮮第一初中級学校)
- West Tokyo Korean No. 2. Elementary and Junior High School (西東京朝鮮第二初中級学校)
- Keiō Chutobu Junior High School (慶應義塾中等部)
- Kunitachi College of Music Junior & High School
- Kyōritsu Joshi Junior and Senior High School, affiliated with Kyoritsu Women's University
- Meiho Junior & Senior High School
- Meiji Gakuin Junior High School & Meiji Gakuin Higashimurayama High School
- Meiji Nakano Junior and Senior High School
- Meiji University Meiji High School and Meiji Junior High School
- Meisei Junior/Senior High School
- Miwada Gakuen Junior and Senior High School
- Musashi International School (formerly Little Angels International School) (Junior high division)
- Musashi Junior and Senior High School
- Nakamura Junior & Senior Girls' High School
- Nitobe Bunka Gakuen Junior and Senior High School
- Nittaidai Ohka High School - Junior and senior high school
- Ōtsuma Junior and Senior High School, affiliated with Otsuma Women's University
- Otsuma Nakano Junior and Senior High School - Girls' school
- Rikkyo Ikebukuro Junior and Senior High School
- Sacred Heart School in Tokyo (Junior high school division)
- St. Hilda's School (Kōran Jogakkō Junior High and Senior High School)
- St. Mary's International School (Junior high school division)
- Salesians of Don Bosco Salesian Primary and Junior High School (サレジオ小学校・中学校)
- Seigakuin Junior & Senior High School
- Seikei Junior and Senior High School
- Seiryo Junior High and Senior High School
- Seisen International School (Junior high school division)
- Seisoku Gakuen Senior High School
- Shibaura Institute of Technology Junior and Senior High School
- Shinagawa Joshi Gakuin Junior High and Senior High School
- Shinagawa Shouei Junior and Senior High School, formerly Ono Gakuen Girls' Junior High and Senior High School (小野学園女子中学・高等学校)
- Shirayuri Joshi Gakuen Junior and Senior High School, affiliated with Shirayuri Women's University
- Shoei Girls' Junior and Senior High School
- Shotoku Gakuen Junior and Senior High School
- Showa Women's University Junior-Senior High School
- Soka Junior and Senior High School
- Takanawa Junior / Senior High School
- Toho Girls' Junior and Senior High School
- Tokyo Denki University Junior High School/High School
- Tokyo Joshi Gakuin Junior & Senior High School (Junior and senior high school)
- Ueno Gakuen Junior and Senior High School
- Waseda Jitsugyo Primary, Junior High, and Senior High School
- Waseda University Junior and Senior High School
- Wayō Kudan Joshi Gakuen Junior and Senior High School, affiliated with Wayo Women's University

Former:

- German School Tokyo (now in Yokohama)

== See also ==
- List of high schools in Tokyo
- List of elementary schools in Tokyo
- List of kindergartens in Tokyo
