= List of single-gender schools in Japan =

This is a list of single-gender schools (boys' schools and girls' schools) in Japan.

== Aichi Prefecture ==
- Hikarigaoka Girls' High School

== Chiba Prefecture ==
- Wayo Konodai Girls' Junior High School & Senior High School

== Gifu Prefecture ==
- Gifu Daiichi High School – Boys' school

== Hyōgo Prefecture ==
- Nada High School – Boys' school

== Ibaraki Prefecture ==
Girls' Schools

- Taisei Girls' High School(大成女子等学校）
- Ibaraki Prefectural Mito Second High School (茨城県立水戸第二高等学校）Coeducational, but all students are female
- Aikoku Gakuen Ryugasaki High School (愛国学園大学附属龍ヶ崎高等学校)
- Seitoku University Affiliated Toride Seitoku Girls' Junior & Senior High School (聖徳大学附属取手聖徳女子中学校・高等学校)
- Mito Girls' High School (水戸女子高等学校)

== Kanagawa Prefecture ==
Boys' schools

- Asano Junior & Senior High School
- Eiko Gakuen
- Keio Senior High School
- Keio Futsubu School a.k.a. Keio Gijuku Futsubu (慶應義塾普通部, Keiō Gijuku Futsubu; junior high school)

Girls schools

- Caritas Girls' Junior & Senior High School
- Ferris Girls' Junior & Senior High School (Yokohama)
- Hosei University Girls' High School
- Kamakura Jogakuin Junior and Senior High School
- Kanrei Shirayuri Gakuen Junior/Senior High School
- Kitakamakura Girls' High School
- Kanrei Shirayuri Gakuen Junior/Senior High School (Hakone)
- Seishin Girls' High School
- Shonan Joshi Senior High School
- Shonan Shirayuri Gakuen Junior High School and High School (Fujisawa)
- Takagi Gakuen Girls' High School
- Yokohama Eiri Girls' High School
- Yokohama International Girls' Institute Suiryo High School
- Yokohama Jogakuin Junior and Senior High School

== Kobe Prefecture ==
- Kobe Kaisei Girls' Junior & Senior High School
- Kōbe Yamate Girls' Junior & Senior High School
- Kōbe Tokiwa Girls' High School

== Kumamoto Prefecture ==
- Tamana Girls High School

== Miyagi Prefecture ==
- Sendai Shirayuri Gakuen Junior High School and High School

== Osaka Prefecture ==
- Eifu Girls' Upper Secondary Specialized Training School
- Osaka Seikei Girls' High School
- Osaka Jogakuin Junior and Senior High School
- Osaka Kunei Jogakuin Junior and Senior High School
- Osaka Shin-Ai Jogakuin (Elementary through High School)
- Ohtani Junior and Senior High School
- Poole Gakuin Junior and Senior High School

== Saitama Prefecture ==
Boys' schools

- Keio Shiki Senior High School
- Saitama Prefectural Urawa High School (埼玉県立浦和高等学校）

== Shizuoka Prefecture ==
- Seien Girls' High School (Hamamatsu)

== Tokyo Metropolis ==
Separate boys' and girls' schools

- Jiyu Gakuen - Coeducational for elementary school and separate gender for junior-senior high school

Boys' schools

- Azabu High School
- Gakushuin Boys' Junior and Senior High School
- Gyosei Junior and Senior High School
- Gyosei Primary School (暁星小学校)
- Junior and Senior High School at Komaba, University of Tsukuba
- Kaisei Academy
- Kogyokusha Junior High and Senior High School
- Musashi Junior and Senior High School
- Rikkyo Ikebukuro Junior and Senior High School
- St. Mary's International School
- Seigakuin Junior & Senior High School
- Seisoku Gakuen Senior High School
- Takanawa Junior / Senior High School
- Tokyo Gakuen High School
- Waseda University Junior and Senior High School

Girls' schools

- Chiyoda Jo-Gakuen Junior and Senior High School
- Edogawa Girls' Junior & High School
- Fujimi Junior & Senior High School
- Fujimura Girls' Junior and Senior High School
- Futaba Gakuen Elementary School (雙葉小学校), girls' school
- Futaba Gakuen Junior and Senior High School
- Gakushuin Girls' Junior and Senior High School (Shinjuku)
- Hosen Gakuen Junior and Senior High School – Has coeducational and girls' only sections
- International School of the Sacred Heart (all girls' for grades 1–12)
- Joshigakuin Junior and Senior High School
- Joshi Seigakuin Junior & Senior High School
- Joshibi High School of Art and Design
- Juntoku Girls' High School
- Kanda Jo-Gakuen Junior and Senior High School
- Keio Girls Senior High School
- Kichijo Girls' School (junior and senior high school)
- Koka Gakuen Junior & Senior High School for Girls
- Komazawa Gakuen Girls' Junior High School-Senior High School
- Kunimoto Alberta International School
- Kunimoto Girls' Junior and Senior High School
- Kyōritsu Joshi Junior and Senior High School, affiliated with Kyoritsu Women's University
- Miwada Gakuen Junior and Senior High School
- Nakamura Junior & Senior Girls' High School
- Nihon Ongaku High School (plans to become coeducational in 2023, with the new name Shinagawa Gakugei High School (品川学藝高等学校))
- Ohyu Gakuen Girls' Junior and Senior High School
- Ōtsuma Junior and Senior High School, affiliated with Otsuma Women's University
- Otsuma Nakano Junior and Senior High School
- Otsuma Tama Junior and Senior High School
- St. Hilda's School (Kōran Jogakkō Junior High and Senior High School)
- Sacred Heart School in Tokyo
- Seisen International School
- Shinagawa Etoile Girls' High School
- Shinagawa Joshi Gakuin Junior High and Senior High School
- Shirayuri Joshi Gakuen Elementary School (白百合学園小学校), girls' school, affiliated with Shirayuri Women's University
- Shirayuri Joshi Gakuen Junior and Senior High School, affiliated with Shirayuri Women's University
- Shoei Girls' Junior and Senior High School
- Showa Women's University Junior-Senior High School
- Tachikawa Girls' High School
- Toho Girls' Junior and Senior High School
- Tokyo Joshi Gakuin Junior & Senior High School (junior and senior high school)
- Wayō Kudan Joshi Gakuen Junior and Senior High School, affiliated with Wayo Women's University

== Former single gender schools ==
Boys'

- Hachioji Academy (became coeducational in 1947)
- The Second Junior and Senior High School of Nihon University (日本大学第二中学校 • 高等学校), junior high became coeducational in April 1996, high school became coeducational in April 1997

Girls'

- Aoyama Gakuin Yokohama Eiwa High School (was a girls' school until 2018)
- Jiyu Gakuen Girls' School (Tokyo)
- Ono Gakuen Girls' Junior High and Senior High School (小野学園女子中学・高等学校), now Shinagawa Shouei Junior and Senior High School
- Osaka Girls' Senior High School, became coeducational and is now Abeno Shogaku High School
- Sagano Girls' High School, became coeducational in 1950 as Sagano High School
- Ibaraki Prefectural Mito Second High School (茨城県立水戸第二高等学校), formerly Ibaraki Prefectural Girls' High School and Ibaraki Prefectural Mito Girls' High School, while it is technically a coeducational school from its website it is "essentially an all-girls' school" and all students are female
- Ibaraki Prefectural Hitachi Second High School (茨城県立日立第二高等学校), coeducational, but the amount of male students are extremely low
