= List of high schools in Tokyo =

This is a list of high schools in Tokyo Metropolis, including the 23 special wards, West Tokyo, and the Tokyo Islands (Izu Islands and Ogasawara Subprefecture).

== National ==
- The University of Tokyo Secondary School 東京大学教育学部附属中等教育学校
- Ochanomizu University Senior High School お茶の水女子大学附属高等学校
- Junior and Senior High School at Otsuka, University of Tsukuba筑波大学附属高等学校
- Junior and Senior High School at Komaba, University of Tsukuba筑波大学附属駒場高等学校
- Tokyo Gakugei University Senior High School 東京学芸大学附属高等学校
- Tokyo Gakugei University International Secondary School東京学芸大学附属国際中等教育学校
- Institute of Science Tokyo High School 東京科学大学附属科学技術高校
- Music High School Attached to the Faculty of Music, Tokyo University of the Arts東京芸術大学音楽学部附属音楽高等学校
- Tokyo National College of Technology - See Colleges of technology in Japan (which have students ages 15 and older)

== Metropolitan ==
All are operated by the Tokyo Metropolitan Government Board of Education.

- Adachi Senior High School
- Adachi Nishi Senior High School
- Adachi Shinden Senior High School
- Akirudai Senior High School
- Asuka Senior High School
- Chihaya Senior High School
- Denen Chofu Senior High School
- Fuchie Senior High School
- Fuchu Senior High School
- Fuchu Nishi High School
- Fuji Senior High School
- Hachioji Higashi High School
- Hakuo Senior High School
- Harumi Sogo Senior High School
- Hibiya Senior High School
- Hino Senior High School
- Hinodai Senior High School
- Hiroo Senior High School
- Igusa Senior High School
- Jindai Senior High School
- Johtoh Senior High School
- Kamata Senior High School
- Kasai Minami Senior High School
- Kirigaoka Senior High School
- Kitatama Senior High School
- Kiyose Higashi High School
- Koganei Kita Senior High School
- Koishikawa Senior High School
- Koiwa Senior High School
- Kokusai Senior High School
- Komae Senior High School
- Koyamadai Senior High School
- Kudan Senior High School
- Kunitachi Senior High School
- Kurume Senior High School
- Machida Senior High School
- Matsubara Senior High School
- Matsugaya Senior High School
- Meguro Senior High School
- Minami Senior High School
- Minami Tama Senior High School
- Mita Senior High School
- Mitaka Secondary School (東京都立三鷹中等教育学校)
- Mizuho Nōgei High School
- Mizumoto Senior High School
- Mukogaoka Senior High School
- Musashi Senior High School
- Musashigaoka Senior High School
- Musashino Kita Senior High School
- Musashi Murayama Senior High School
- Nagayama Senior High School
- Nihonbashi Senior High School
- Nishi Senior High School
- Ogawa Senior High School
- Ome Higashi Senior High School
- Omori Senior High School
- Ōshūkan Secondary School
- Oyama Senior High School
- Roka Senior High School
- Ryogoku Senior High School
- Sakuramachi Senior High School
- Shakuji Senior High School
- Shimura Senior High School
- Shinjuku Senior High School
- Showa Senior High School
- Suginami High School
- Suginami Sogo Senior High School
- Sunagawa Senior High School
- Tachikawa Senior High School
- Tadao Senior High School
- Tagara Senior High School
- Takashima Senior High School
- Takehaya Senior High School
- Tama Senior High School
- Tanashi Senior High School
- Toyama Senior High School
- Tsubasa Sogo Senior High School
- Ueno Senior High School
- Ueno Shinobugaoka Senior High School
- Yashio Senior High School
- Yukigaya Senior High School
- Akabane Commercial High School
- Arakawa Commercial High School
- Ichigaya Commercial High School
- Shiba Commercial High School
- Ushigome Commercial High School
- Yotsuya Commercial High School
- Hachioji Industrial High School
- Honjo Industrial High School
- Koishikawa Industrial High School
- Kuramae Industrial High School
- Mukojima Industrial High School
- Nakano Industrial High School
- Oji Industrial High School
- Rokugo Industrial High School
- Setagaya Industrial High School
- Adachi Technical High School
- Senior High School affiliated to Tokyo Metropolitan University

== Municipal ==
23 Wards

- Chiyoda
  - Kudan Secondary School - Senior high school division

== Foreign government-operated ==
- Russian Embassy School in Tokyo
- Yokota High School (DoDEA)

== Private ==
- Adachi Gakuen Junior and Senior High School
- American School in Japan (Senior high school division)
- Aoba-Japan International School (high school division)
- Azabu Junior & Senior High School
- British School of Tokyo (Secondary school/sixth form divisions)
- The Junior High and Senior High School affiliated to the Bunkyo University
- Canadian International School (Senior high school division)
- Tokyo Chinese School (Senior high school division)
- Chiyoda Jo-Gakuen Junior and Senior High School
- Christian Academy in Japan
- Chuogakuin University Chuo High School
- Chuo University Junior and High School
- Dalton Tokyo Junior & Senior High School
- Edogawa Girls' Junior & High School
- Lycée Français International de Tokyo (Senior high school division)
- Fujimi Junior & Senior High School
- Fujimura Girls' Junior and Senior High School
- Futaba Gakuen Junior and Senior High School
- Gakushuin Boys' Junior and Senior High School
- Gakushuin Girls' Junior and Senior High School
- Global Indian International School, Tokyo Campus (Senior high school division)
- Gyosei Junior and Senior High School
- Horikoshi High School
- Hosei University Junior and Senior High School
- Hosen Gakuen Junior and Senior High School - Has coeducational and girls' only sections
- Hoyu-Gakuin High School
- International Christian University High School
- International School of the Sacred Heart (junior high school division)
- Jissen Gakuen High School |ja|実践学園中学・高等学校
- Jiyu Gakuen - Separate junior-senior high schools for female and male students
- Joshigakuin Junior and Senior High School
- Joshi Seigakuin Junior & Senior High School
- Joshibi High School of Art and Design
- Junten Junior High School Junten Senior High School
- Juntoku Girls' High School
- K. International School Tokyo (Senior high school division)
- Kaetsu Ariake Junior and Senior High School
- Kaisei Junior & Senior High School
- Kanda Jo-Gakuen Junior and Senior High School
- Keimei Gakuen
- Kichijo Girls' School (junior and senior high school)
- Kikokushijo Academy International School
- Kinjo High School
- Kogyokusha Junior High and Senior High School
- Koka Gakuen Junior & Senior High School for Girls
- Komaba Toho High School
- Komazawa Gakuen Girls' Junior High School-Senior High School
- Tokyo Korean School (Senior high division)
- Tokyo Korean Junior and Senior High School
- Kunimoto Alberta International School
- Kunimoto Girls Junior and Senior High School
- Kunitachi College of Music Junior & High School
- Kyōritsu Joshi Junior and Senior High School, affiliated with Kyoritsu Women's University
- Meiho Junior & Senior High School
- Meiji Gakuin Junior High School & Meiji Gakuin Higashimurayama High School
- Meiji Nakano Junior and Senior High School
- Meiji University Meiji High School and Meiji Junior High School
- Meisei High School
- Meisei Junior/Senior High School
- Miwada Gakuen Junior and Senior High School
- Musashi International School Tokyo (formerly Little Angels International School) (Senior high division)
- Musashi Junior and Senior High School
- Nakamura Junior & Senior Girls' High School
- NHK Gakuen
- Nihon Ongaku High School (plans to become coeducational in 2023, with the new name Shinagawa Gakugei High School (品川学藝高等学校))
- Nippon Wellness High School
- Nitobe Bunka Gakuen Junior and Senior High School
- Nittaidai Ohka High School - Junior and senior high school
- Oin Gakuen
- Oizumi Gakuen High School
- Ōtsuma Junior and Senior High School, affiliated with Otsuma Women's University
- Otsuma Nakano Junior and Senior High School - Girls' school
- Rikkyo Ikebukuro Junior and Senior High School
- Sacred Heart School in Tokyo (Senior high school division)
- St. Hilda's School (Kōran Jogakkō Junior High and Senior High School)
- St. Joseph's Junior and Senior High School
- St. Mary's International School (Senior high school division)
- Seigakuin Junior & Senior High School
- Seikei Junior and Senior High School
- Seisen International School (Senior high school division)
- Seiryo Junior High and Senior High School
- Seisa Kokusai High School
- Seisoku Gakuen Senior High School
- Shibaura Institute of Technology Junior and Senior High School
- Shibuya Junior and Senior High School
- Shinagawa Etoile Girls' High School
- Shinagawa Joshi Gakuin Junior High and Senior High School
- Shinagawa Shouei Junior and Senior High School, formerly Ono Gakuen Girls' Junior High and Senior High School (小野学園女子中学・高等学校)
- Shiraume Gakuen High School
- Shirayuri Joshi Gakuen Junior and Senior High School, affiliated with Shirayuri Women's University
- Shoei Girls' Junior and Senior High School
- Shoin Junior and Senior High School (Tokyo)
- Showa Daiichi Gakuen High School
- Showa Women's University Junior-Senior High School
- Soka Junior and Senior High School
- Shotoku Gakuen Junior and Senior High School
- Tachikawa Girls' High School
- Takanawa Junior / Senior High School
- Takushoku University Daiichi High School
- Tamagawa Gakuen Junior and Senior High School
- Toa Gakuen High School
- Toho Girls' Junior and Senior High School
- Tōyō Eiwa Jogakuin
- Tokyo Denki University Junior High School/High School
- Tokyo High School
- Tokyo Gakuen High School
- Ueno Gakuen Junior and Senior High School
- Waseda Jitsugyo Primary, Junior High, and Senior High School
- Waseda University Junior and Senior High School
- Wako Gakuen High School
- Wayō Kudan Joshi Gakuen Junior and Senior High School, affiliated with Wayo Women's University

Former:

- German School Tokyo (now in Yokohama)

== Online ==
- Tokyo Inter-High School

== See also ==
- List of junior high schools in Tokyo
- List of elementary schools in Tokyo
