= Christian Academy in Japan =

Coordinates: 35°45′32″N 139°32′11″E

Location
- 1-2-14 Shinkawa-cho, Higashikurume-shi, Tokyo 〒203-0013; Higashikurume; Japan

Information
- Type: Private
- Motto: Equipping and inspiring students to serve Japan and the world for Christ
- Established: 1950
- CEEB code: 680420
- High School Principal: Tyrone Fambro
- Middle School Principal: Renee Van Druff
- Elementary School Principal: Jean Hino
- Head of school: David Mawhinney
- Enrollment: 464 (2008-09 SY) + 285 in Parallels
- Language: English
- Hours in school day: 7
- Colors: Blue and Gold
- Song: Hail, Alma Mater!
- Mascot: Knights
- Nickname: Knights
- Accreditation: Western Association of Schools and Colleges
- Parallels Director: Jacquie Willson
- Website: https://caj.ac.jp/
- Last updated: 2026-11-19

Christian Academy in Japan (クリスチャン・アカデミー・イン・ジャパン) (CAJ), established in 1950, is a private Christian school in the city of Higashikurume, Tokyo, Japan that provides a Christian American-style education in English.

== Mission and history ==
The stated mission of Christian Academy in Japan is to "equip students to serve Japan and the world for Christ".

The school was established to provide a Christian education to the children of missionaries who arrived primarily after World War II, following General Douglas McArthur's call for 1000 missionaries to be sent to Japan, during the Allied occupation of Japan from 1945-1951.

CAJ opened initially in 1950 in Suginami, Tokyo, and moved to its current location of Higashikurume, Tokyo in 1951. The land was purchased from a farm that supplied dairy to the imperial family. The existing dairy were converted into school's first classrooms and additional buildings were added between 1961 - 1972 and with further expansions in later years.

== Student body profile ==
CAJ enrolls over 460 students, from kindergarten through high school. About 35% of the students are dependents of Christian missionaries who work for about 40 different mission organizations. The students come from 20 countries, with 48% from Japan, 35% from the United States, and 28% from Korea; 33% of students have multiple nationalities. Most students commute to school by public transportation, bicycle or walking.

The four-acre (16,000 m²) campus in the western suburbs of Tokyo, accessible by the Seibu Ikebukuro Line, includes a classroom building, auditorium, library, artificial turf soccer field, gymnasium, computer lab, home economics and industrial arts facilities, and dining hall.

== Activities ==
CAJ has a wide range of activities for its students. Chapel is included for all ages, and there is a annual Spiritual Life Emphasis Week (SLEW). Elementary school activities include several musical groups and various field trips. Middle and high school activities include the CAJ Student Council, spiritual life committee, various sports, drama, music, field trips, yearbook/school newspaper, and community service opportunities.

CAJ has an award winning VEX VRC Robotics program. CAJ VEX Robotics teams have won numerous awards at regional competitions. VRC Team 99484A from CAJ was selected to represent Japan at the VEX Robotics World Championships in 2016, 2017, 2019, 2020, 2021, 2022, 2023, and 2024. Additionally, team 99484B was selected to participate in 2018. At the Fall 2018 regional championship competing with schools from Northeast Asia and Hawaii, CAJ teams won the Judges Award and the Excellence Award (overall first place).

== Accreditation ==
CAJ has been accredited by the Western Association of Schools and Colleges since 1976.

== Sponsoring mission groups ==
Christian Academy in Japan is owned and operated by the following six evangelical mission groups:

- TEAM (The Evangelical Alliance Mission)
- Christian Reformed World Missions
- Evangelical Covenant Church Board of World Missions
- OMS
- SEND International
- WorldVenture (formerly CBInternational)

== Notable alumni ==
- Shreyan Bagwadkar, model
- Kiko Wilson ('11), singer and actress
- Simon Nakamura ('25), cross country runner, record holder of CAJ
- Hisho Uga (‘05), national director of OneHope Japan
- Yu Shibuya (‘97), writer and director

== See also ==
- List of international schools in Japan
- List of high schools in Tokyo
- List of junior high schools in Tokyo
- List of elementary schools in Tokyo
