= Tamana Girls High School =

Coordinates: 32°55′56.2″N 130°33′20.5″E

- 玉名女子高校学校
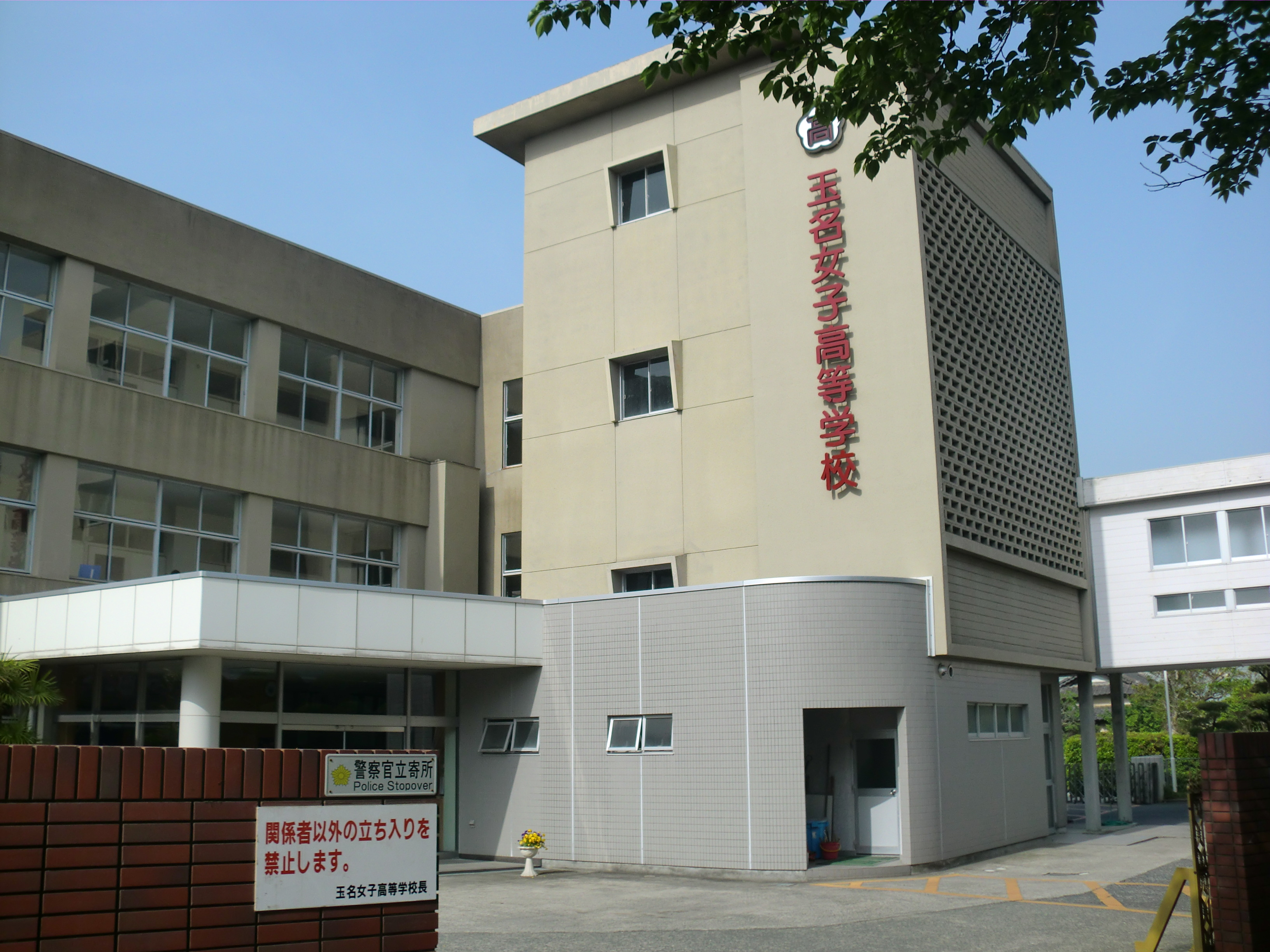
- The school in 2011
- Tamana, Kumamoto; Japan

Information
- Type: high school (girls)
- Established: April 1925
- Grades: 10-12
- Campus type: Private
- Website: https://www.tamanajoshi-h.ed.jp/

Tamana Girls High School (玉名女子高校学校 Tamana joshi kōkōgakkō) is a girls high school in Tamana, Kumamoto, Japan. It was founded in April 1925 under the name 'tamana jussen jogakuin' (lit. Tamana Practice Girls' College). In 1963 assumed its present name.

== Renaming History ==
- 1925 'tamana jussen jogakuin' (Tamana Practice Girls' College)
- 1927 'tamana jussen jogakkō' (Tamana Practice Girls' School)
- 1929 'tamana joshi shokugyō gakkō' (Tamana All-Girls Business School)
- 1942 'kumamoto-ken tamana kōtō kasei jogakuin' (Tamana Girls' Household School of Kumamoto)
- 1948 'tamana kasei kōtōgakkō' (Tamana Household School)
- 1963 'tamana joshi kōtō gakkō'(Tamana Girls' High School)

== Subjects ==
Some subjects taught at Tamana High School are:

- Business
- Culinary
- Nursing

== Sister Schools ==
- Clarinda High School (Clarinda, IA)
- Graham-Kapowsin High School (Spanaway, WA)
