= Tokyo Gakuen High School =

Coordinates: 35.627966°N 139.698114°E

Tokyo Gakuen High School Tokyo Commercial School
- 6-12-25, Shimomeguro, Meguro-Ku, Tokyo; Japan

Information
- Type: Private high school
- Motto: 不撓不屈 (friendship, cooperation, independence)
- Established: 1889
- Principal: Mr. Tsutomu Sudou
- Grades: 9-12
- Website: Official site

Tokyo Gakuen High School (東京学園高等学校; "Tokyo Gakuen High School") is a high school in Japan. The traditional school uniform is a basic black gakuran with brass buttons while the summer version consists of gray pants and a white shirt. The school is divided into three semesters in a typical year of studies. Gas pumps are used for the purpose of heating and air conditioning the entire school. This school also has consistently maintained a boys-only policy despite an increased number of gender equality measures being carried out.

== See also ==
- List of high schools in Tokyo

== See also ==
- List of high schools in Japan
