= Aoba-Japan International School =

Coordinates: 35°45′16.26″N 139°37′25.30″E

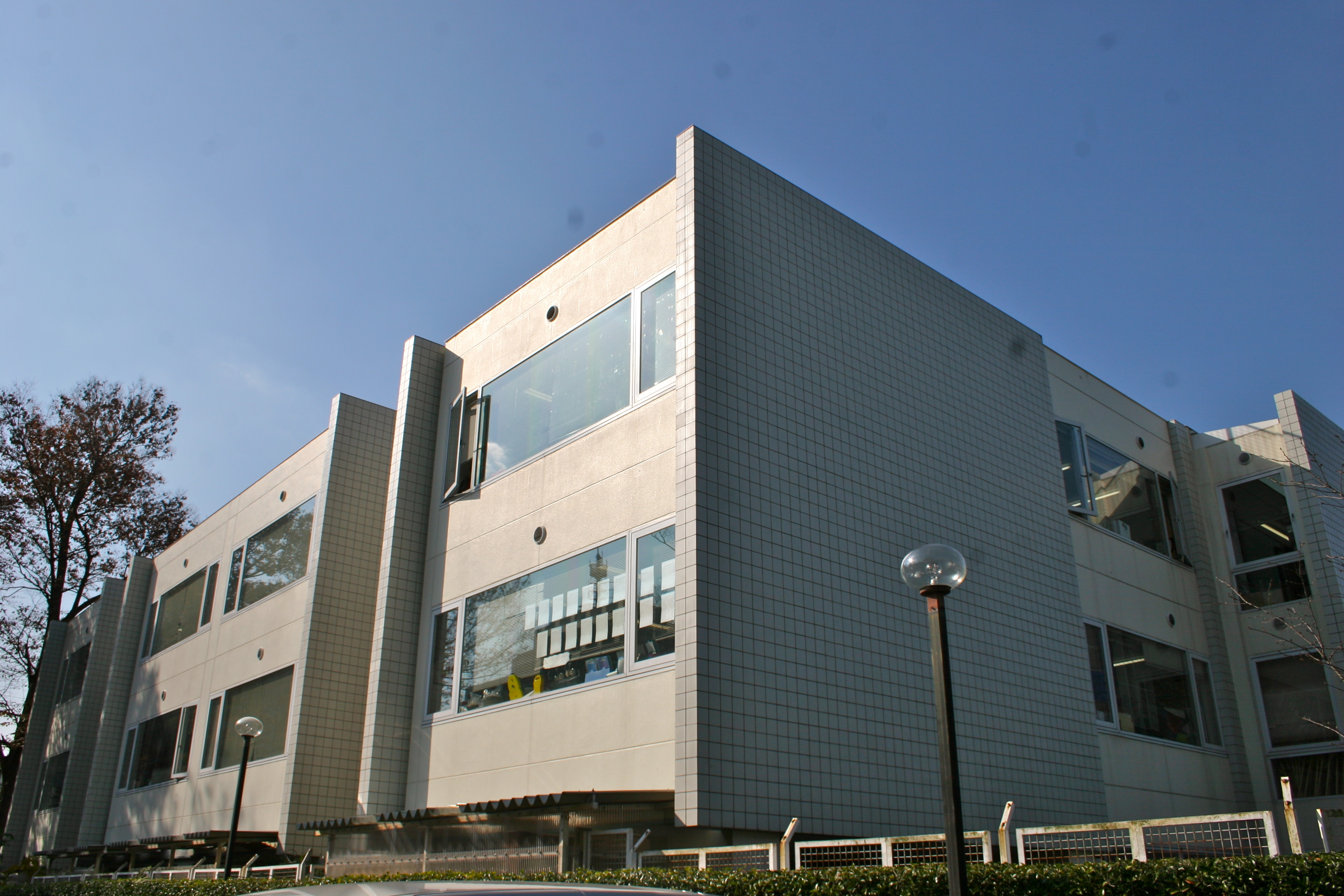
- Meguro, Nerima, and Bunkyo, Tokyo; Japan

Information
- Type: Private
- Motto: Be the Best You Can Be
- Established: 1976
- Founder: Regina Mary Doi
- Head of school: Ken Sell
- Grades: preK-12
- Colors: Green and Yellow
- Mascot: Jaguar
- Accreditation: CIS, NEASC, International Baccalaureate
- Website: aobajapan.jp

Aoba-Japan International School is an international school in Tokyo, with campuses in Nerima, Bunkyo, and Meguro.

== Introduction and history ==
Aoba-Japan International School was initially founded as Aoba International School (AIS) in 1976 by Regina M. Doi in the Meguro area of central Tokyo. Shortly after being founded, the school moved to a site adjacent to Saigoyama Park. A second campus was established near Daikanyama Station in 1979 under the name Japan International School (JIS). This campus included an elementary and middle school. Due to increasing enrollment, A-JIS moved to Harajuku in 1980, Suginami in 1991, and to its present location in Hikarigaoka in 2012.

In 2014 Aoba Japan International School was acquired by Business Breakthrough (BBT). It embarked on a mission to become an internationally recognized provider of K-12 international education. It has since grown to include 5 Tokyo based schools: A-JIS (Hikarigaoka and Meguro), JCQ, Rainbow International School, Summer Hill International School, and Waseda International School.

== Accreditation and curriculum ==
The school is accredited by the Council of International Schools (CIS), New England Association of Schools and Colleges (NEASC), and the International Baccalaureate Organization (IBO). In 2015, Aoba – Japan International School became an IB World School. It currently offers the PYP and DP, and is an MYP candidate school. A-JIS has implemented the International Baccalaureate (IB) curriculum with an emphasis on developing the characteristics of global leaders, entrepreneurs, and innovators in the school learners. The school focuses on building effective communication, problem solving, and wise risk taking skills.

== Extracurricular ==
Extracurricular activities are also strongly encouraged at A-JIS. Extra curricular offerings include: athletics, music, the after school program, global leadership, clubs, student union, and guidance counseling. The school participates in the Kanto Plains Schools’ Association (KP), the World Scholars Cup, the EN Foundation Creating Balance Event, the Nadia Tohoku Relief U-12 Soccer Tournament, and numerous other important events, activities, and initiatives.

== Notable alumni ==
- Rima Nakabayashi, rapper and singer (NiziU)
- Shuuya Haruna, actress and model

== See also ==
- List of high schools in Tokyo
