= Kanrei Shirayuri Gakuen Junior/Senior High School =

School in Hakone, Japan

- 函嶺白百合学園中学校・高等学校
- The school in 2009

Location
- 1320 Gōra; Hakone, Kanagawa Prefecture, 250-0408; Japan; 35.25163°N 139.04674°E

Information
- Religious affiliation: Catholicism
- Denomination: Sisters of Saint Paul of Chartres
- Established: 1949; 77 years ago
- Website: www.kanrei-shirayuri.ed.jp

Kanrei Shirayuri Gakuen Junior/Senior High School (函嶺白百合学園中学校・高等学校, Kanrei Shirayuri Gakuen Chūgakkō Kōtōgakkō) is a private girls junior and senior high school in Hakone, Kanagawa Prefecture, Japan.

It was established in 1949 by the Sisters of Saint Paul of Chartres.

The school is on the grounds of Fuji-Hakone-Izu National Park. As of 2019 the school had a total of 350 students, with 170 at the junior high level and 180 at the senior high level.
