= Koishikawa Secondary Education School =

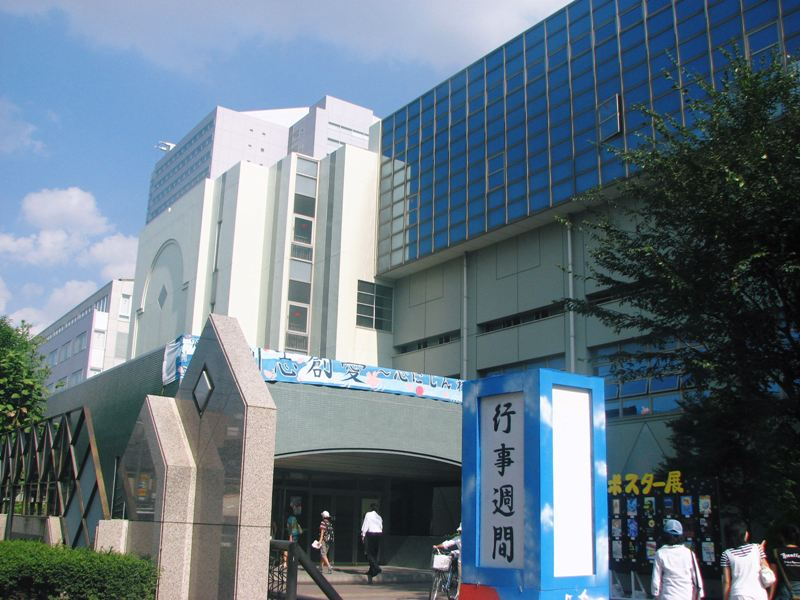

Location
- 2-29-29 Honkomagome, Bunkyō-ku, Tokyo 113-0021, Japan
- 35°43′44″N 139°44′45″E

Information
- Type: Public school (state school)
- Motto: Determination, Exploration, Creation
- Established: 1918 (junior high school), 2006 (secondary school)
- Gender: Male and female
- Age: 12 to 18
- Enrollment: About 950
- Website: http://www.koishikawachuto-e.metro.tokyo.jp/site/zen/index.html

Koishikawa Secondary Education School (東京都立小石川中等教育学校, Tōkyō-toritsu Koishikawa Chūtōkyōikugakkō) is a public day school established by the Tokyo Metropolitan Government. The campus is located in the Bunkyō district of Tokyo, Japan. It is a combined junior high school (students study for 3 years) and senior high school (also 3 years).

== History ==
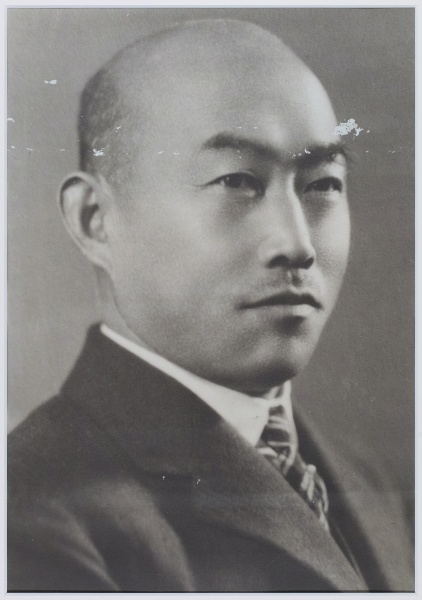
Ito Choshichi

Ito Choshichi, the first principal of the school, attracted attention for his innovative discussion of various educational issues of the time in "Views on Modern Education" published in the Tokyo Asahi Shimbun newspaper, with topics such as "the spread of uniformitarianism" and "poor scientific research.

With the involvement of Tokyo Governor Inoue Tomokazu, Shinpei Goto, and others, he was selected as the first principal of the five prefectural junior high schools. Taking advantage of the location of the Riken institute adjacent to the school, he launched a school that emphasized science and chemistry education, focusing on natural science. The school emphasized experiments such as astronomical and meteorological observations and field trips, taught physics and chemistry from the first year of junior high school, which normally started in the third year of junior high school, used its own textbook on physical chemistry, and gave laboratory lectures in a chemistry laboratory equipped with advanced equipment. Ito's philosophy of "a school that produces scientists" led to a unique education in physics and chemistry that was distinctly different from that of other schools.

Ito, who held liberal education as the ideal, also followed the spirit of Taisho democracy and hired female teachers one after another from the viewpoint of "co-education". In addition, a "relocation retreat team" was formed to experience rural life in Ito's hometown of Shiga-mura, Kitasaku-gun (now Saku-shi), Nagano Prefecture. All of these were groundbreaking ideas at the time, and the names of the five Prefectural Junior High Schools and Choshichi Ito spread throughout Japan as unconventional educators in every way.

Ito, who had extensive experience traveling abroad, including a solo meeting with the President of the United States during his tenure as principal, stressed the need for international education for his students and focused on international exchange and foreign language education. Ito taught English conversation classes by English speakers, foreign language classes using recordings, which were expensive at the time, and in 1921, he had children from all over Japan write letters in English and distributed more than 10,000 letters at overseas destinations, thereby realizing international exchange through correspondence. The following episodes are known as Ito's attempts to make his students aware of the importance of being international citizens in the Taisho era.

On Dragon Boat Festival, Ito and his students flew a paper carp filled with balloons from the schoolyard, hoping that it would reach the United States. It ended up being mailed back from Japan, but Ito told his students, "Gentlemen, this carp streamer went to America and came back to Saitama Prefecture."

He died of pneumonia in 1930. A school funeral was held. Even after Choshichi Ito's death, the educational philosophy of the school was carried on by alumnus Yukio Sanada (6th principal, 1964-1968) and others, and has been carried on to this day.

== Access ==
- 3 minutes on foot from Sengoku Station on the Toei Mita Line.
- 10 minutes on foot from Sugamo Station on the Yamanote Line and Toei Mita Line.

== See also ==
- List of high schools in Tokyo
