= K. International School Tokyo =

Coordinates: 35°40′58.6″N 139°48′1.6″E

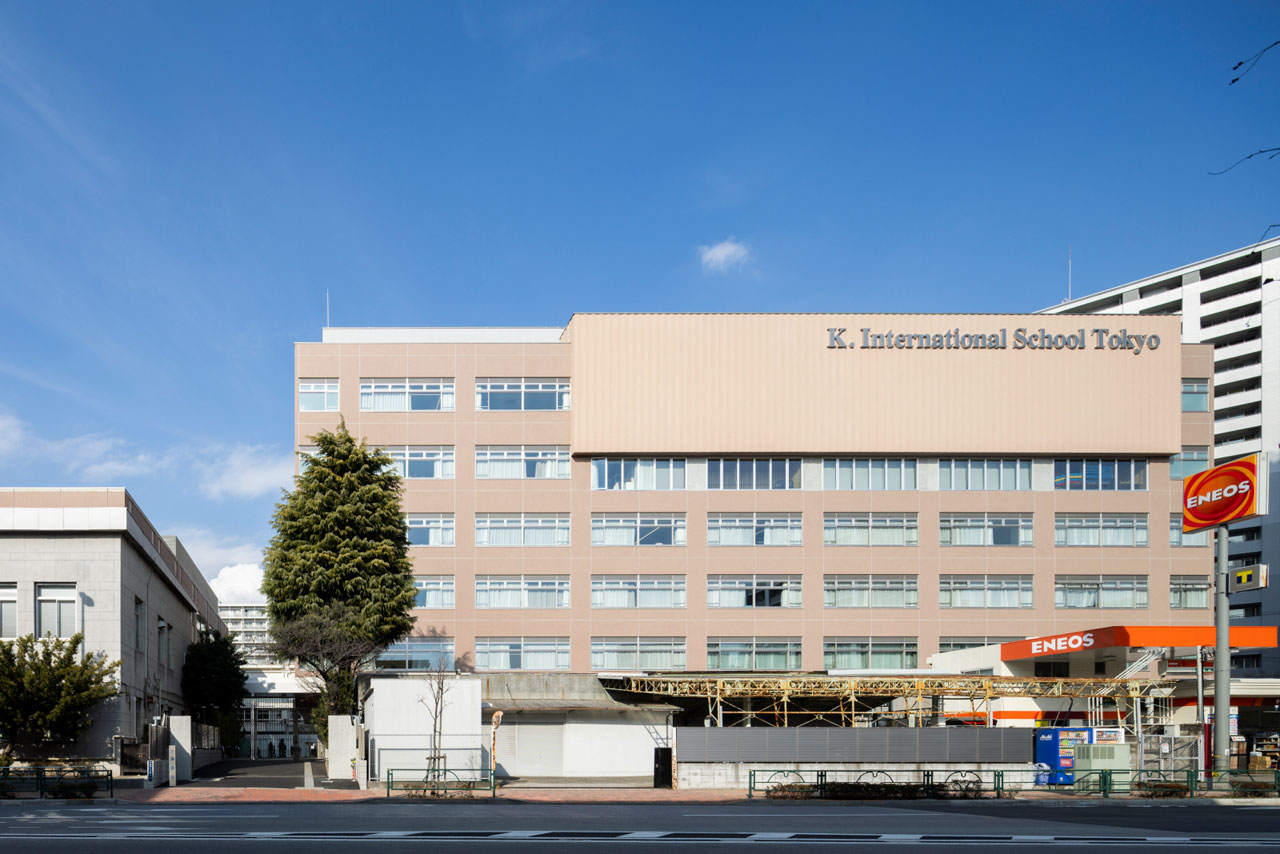
- Tokyo; Japan

Information
- Type: International school
- Motto: "Learning for Life"
- Established: 1997
- Principal: Matthew Archer
- Principal: Mark Cowe
- Head of School: Kevin Yoshihara
- Website: www.kist.ed.jp

K. International School Tokyo (KIST, ケイ・インターナショナルスクール東京 Kei Intānashonaru Sukūru Tōkyō) is a private, non-denominational international school located in Tokyo, Japan, founded in 1997 by Yoshishige and Takako Komaki. the school caters to over 600 students representing a wide range of different nationalities. KIST was the first school in Tokyo and the Kanto region, and the second school in Japan authorized by the International Baccalaureate to offer the three inquiry-based learning programmes for grades 9 and 10. The language of instruction is English. The school is accredited by the Council of International Schools.

The campus has several of the original buildings but opened a new section in August 2009. The elementary school was featured on ABC News where KIST students were interviewed about the UK Royal Wedding between Prince William and Kate Middleton, to show Japanese school children's impressions, on March 28, 2011.

== History ==
April 1997	ECE program began at Higashi-suna, Koto-ku; It was a kindergarten for non-Japanese children
September 1998	Elementary School program began, Grades 1 and 2
September 1999	Elementary School program expanded to Grade 5
July 2000	Recognized as a school foundation by the Tokyo Metropolitan Government
September 2000	Secondary School program began, Grades 6 to 9
January 2002	IB Primary Years Programme authorization received
June 2003	IB Middle Years Programme authorization received, Affiliated with CIS as regular member
September 2003	Grade 10 began
June 2004	IB Diploma Programme authorization received
September 2004	Grade 11 began
September 2005	Grade 12 began
January 2006	PYP re-authorization received
June 2006	Inaugural Grade 12 graduation held
September 2006	Campus relocated to Shirakawa, Koto-ku
April 2007	10th anniversary celebration held
October 2008	IB PYP, MYP and DP Workshops in Tokyo held at KIST
November 2008	Construction of West Building began
August 2009	West Building opened
January 2010	Artificial turf installed on main playground
September 2010	LEAP (Learning Enhancement Academic Program) began
October 2011	MYP-DP re-authorization received
April 2012	EIC (English Intensive Class) began for Grades 6 to 8
June 2012	Inaugural performance of the school song, 'For Tomorrow'
May 2013	Edexcel International GCSE examinations recognition received
August 2014	K. International Preschool (KIPS) opened at Nihonbashi-Hamacho, Chuo-ku
January 2015	Granted candidate status for accreditation by CIS
January 2017	Attained full accreditation by the Council of International Schools (CIS)
January 2018	Joined East Asia Regional Council of International Schools (EARCOS)

Source for table:

=== Mathematics and English ===
The school adheres to the Key Stage 1 and 2 curriculum at the elementary level and the Key Stage 3 curriculum along with the Edexcel International GCSE. Additionally, the school provides an academic support program called the Learning Enhancement Academic Program (LEAP) that is geared toward assisting elementary students with English and Math.

== School building and facilities ==
In 2020, KIST Began Construction of a New Building, Hence Demolishing the Old Gymnasium and Building.

The school used to consist of three buildings: an Elementary Building, The Main building, and Gymnasium.

The elementary building is used by students in the Primary Years Program.

In 2024, Construction of the new School Building was completed. It Contains Multiple Science Labs, a Gymnasium, a Student Lounge, and a Large Library.

== Internet and computers ==
The school provides free Wi-Fi for enrolled students. Laptops are available on each floor of the Elementary School and from the library center in the Secondary School Building. From 9th grade, students are required to bring their own personal laptop to school.

== See also ==
- List of high schools in Tokyo
