= Ōshūkan Secondary School =

Public school in Tokyo, Japan

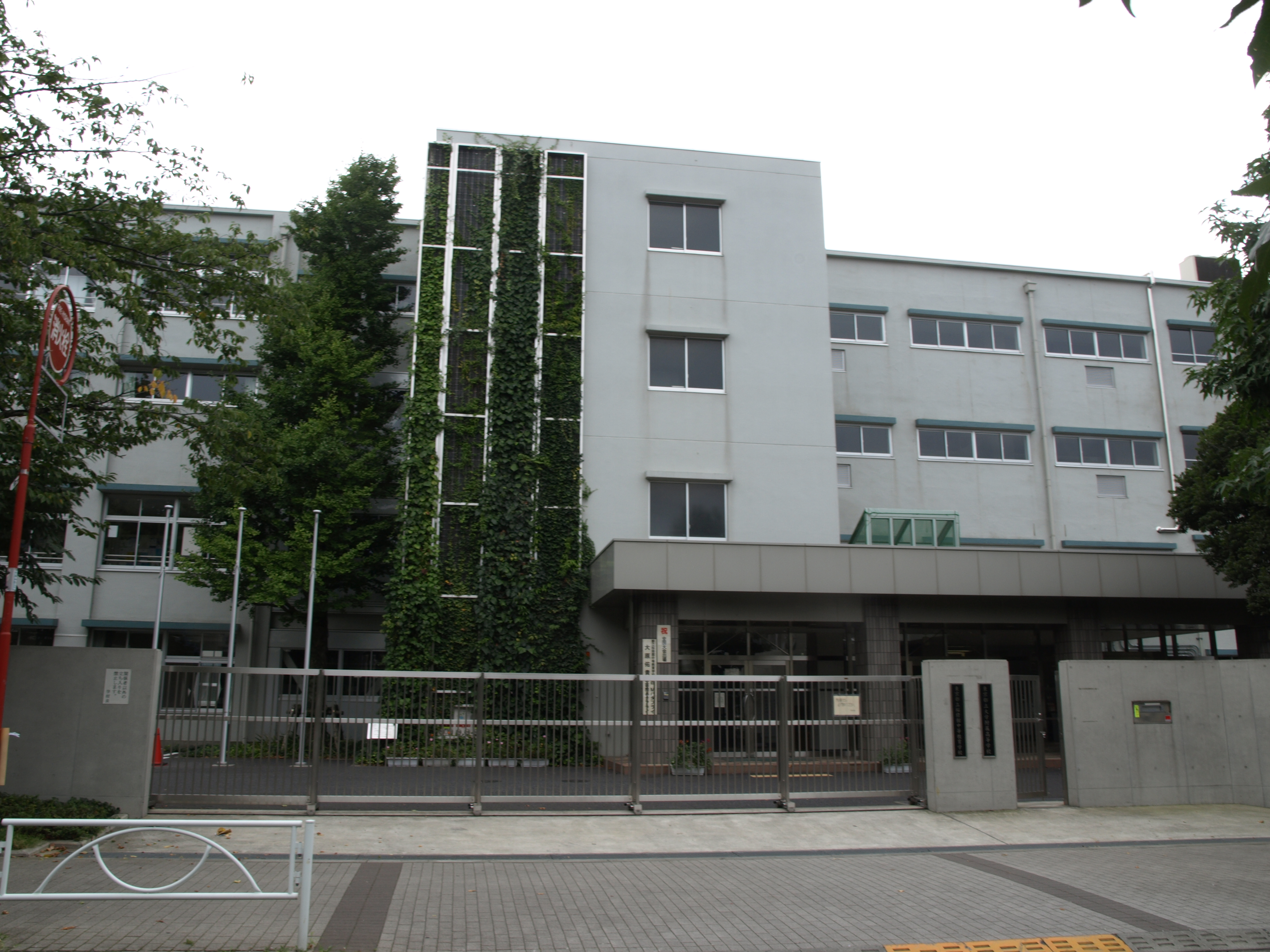

Location
- 1-1-2 Yakumo, Meguro, Tokyo 152-0023, Japan
- Coordinates: 35°37′16″N 139°40′15″E

Information
- Type: Public school
- Established: April 2006
- Principal: Yasutomo Ishizaka
- Gender: Male and female
- Age: 12 to 18
- Enrollment: Approximately 960
- Website: http://www.oshukanchuto-e.metro.tokyo.jp/site/zen/

Ōshūkan Secondary School (東京都立桜修館中等教育学校, Tōkyō-toritsu Ōshūkan Chūtōkyōikugakkō) is a public day school established by the Tokyo Metropolitan Government. The campus is located in the Meguro district of Tokyo, Japan. The school name comes from the Japanese word for cherry blossoms. It is a combined junior high school (students study for 3 years) and senior high school (also 3 years).

== Access ==
The school is 10 minutes on foot from Toritsu-daigaku Station on the Tōkyū Tōyoko Line. City buses also stop at the campus.

== Extracurricular activities ==
Cultural

- Wind instruments
- Field work
- Japanese culture
- Creative section
- Theater
- Photography
- Art
- Light music
- Science

Sports

- Soccer
- Japanese version of baseball
- Tennis (male/female)
- Girls volleyball
- Badminton
- Kendo
- Basketball (male/female)
- Swimming
- Athletics
- Hard baseball
- Archery

== See also ==
- List of high schools in Tokyo
