= Tokyo Inter-High School =

Location
- 1-23-18; World East Building; Shibuya, Tokyo, 150-0002; Japan; 35°39′44.4996″N 139°42′8.892″E

Information
- Former name: Atmark Inter-High School
- Type: Private school
- Established: April 2000
- Website: www.inter-highschool.ne.jp

Tokyo Inter-High School is a primarily online international high school based in Tokyo, Japan. It was founded in 2000. Students who enroll in Tokyo Inter-High School are able to earn an American high school degree from anywhere in the world as long as they have access to a stable internet connection. Traditionally, in-person classes are offered for students who live in Tokyo on their campus located in Shibuya. The American degree is offered through Alger Learning Center & Independence High School located in Sedro-Wooley, Washington. In addition to an American diploma, students can also apply to receive a Japanese diploma.

The school primarily caters to two types of students, students who wish to pursue special activities during their high school years that would be impossible at a traditional school, such as a student who wishes to pursue a career in ballet and must relocate to a foreign country, and students who wish to pursue a collegiate career in a foreign country. Students are able to create their own curriculum, allowing them to effectively use their time spent training their skills as school credits towards their graduation.
