= Shoei Girls' Junior and Senior High School =

School for girls in Tokyo, Japan

Coordinates: 35°37′56″N 139°43′46″E

- 頌栄女子学院 中学校・高等学校
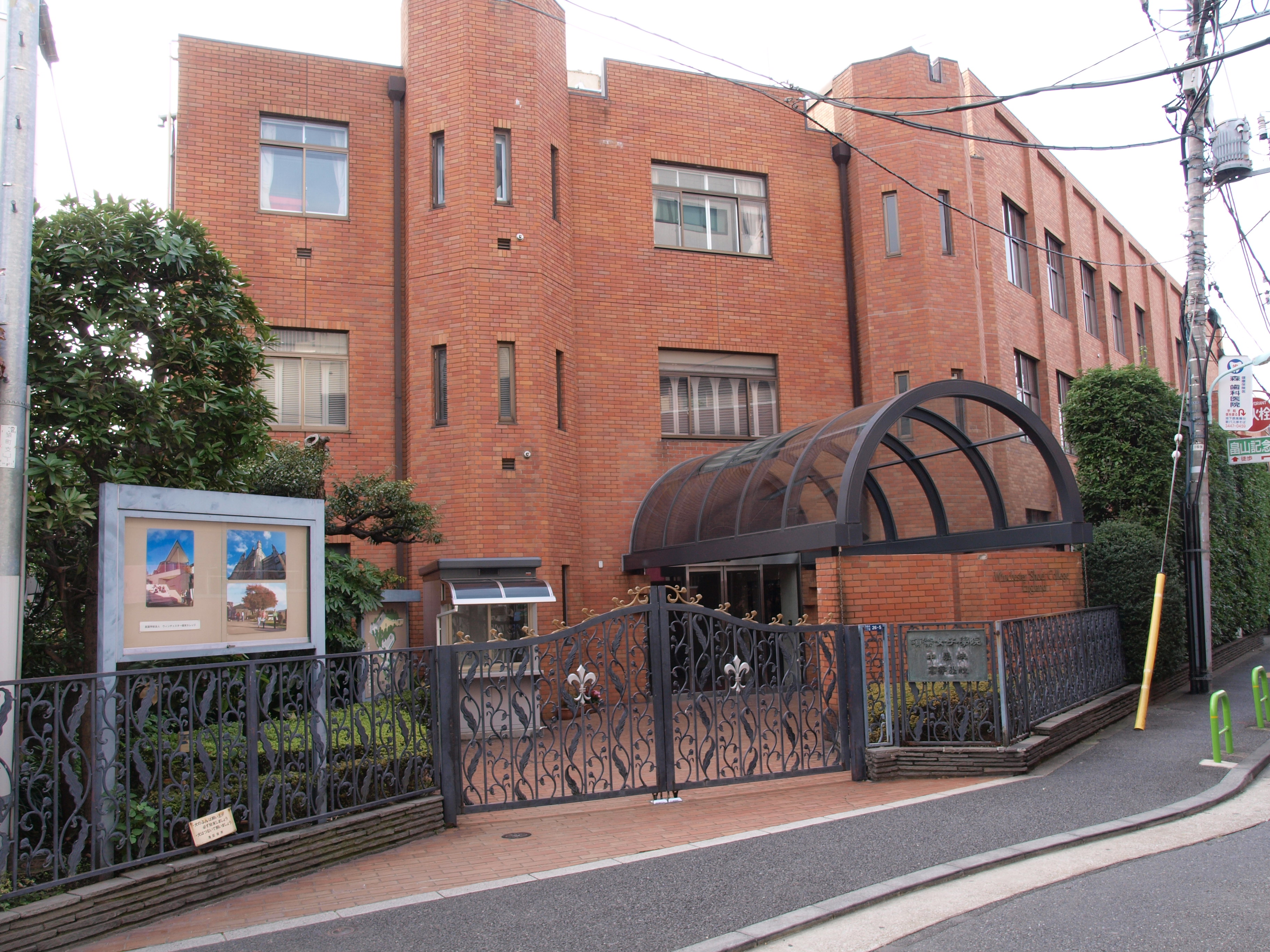
- The school in 2009

Information
- Religious affiliation: Protestantism
- Established: 1982; 44 years ago
- Website: www.shoei.ed.jp

The Shoei Girls' Junior and Senior High School (頌栄女子学院 中学校・高等学校, Shōei Joshi Gakuin Chūgakkō Kōtōgakkō) is a junior and senior high school for girls in Shirokanedai, Minato, Tokyo.

== Affiliates ==
A boarding college in Winchester, Hampshire, England, Winchester Shoei College at the University of Winchester (英国学校法人 Eikoku Gakkō Hōjin), formerly the Shoei Centre at King Alfred's College, is an affiliate of the Shoei Gakuin. It opened in 1982. As of 1983, at one time roughly 40 students, all female and aged 18–20, were a part of this programme. They took special courses in British studies and English Language Teaching (ELT).

== Features ==
Shoei Girls' School is a Protestant school, with places related to Christianity such as Gloria Hall and the chapel. The school is divided by a private road, and the entire school is connected by narrow loopholes and stairs.

== See also ==
- List of high schools in Tokyo
