= Joshi Seigakuin Junior & Senior High School =

School in Tokyo, Japan

- 女子聖学院中学校・高等学校

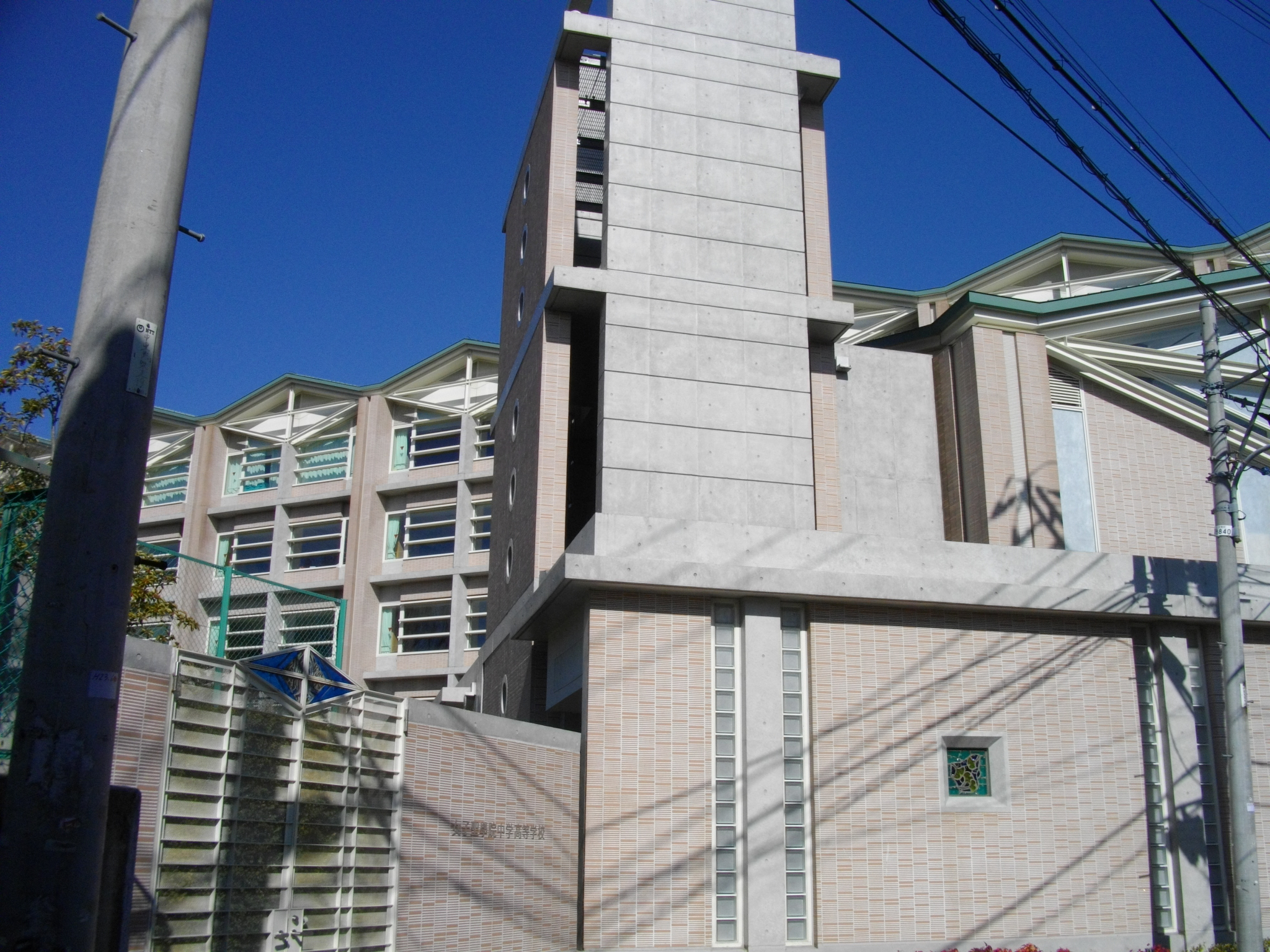
- The school in 2012

Location
- 3-12-2 Nakazato, Kita-ku; Tokyo, 114-8574; Japan; 35.7415°N 139.7516°E

Information
- Religious affiliation: Protestant
- Established: 1905; 121 years ago
- Website: www.joshiseigakuin.ed.jp

Joshi Seigakuin Junior & Senior High School (女子聖学院中学校・高等学校, Joshi Seigakuin Chūgakkō Kōtōgakkō) is a private Christian girls' secondary school in Nakazato, Kita, Tokyo. It is a part of the Seigakuin educational group.

In 1905 the school was established.

== See also ==
- List of high schools in Tokyo
- Seigakuin University
