= Showa Women's University Junior-Senior High School =

School in Setagaya, Tokyo

Coordinates: 35.6439°N 139.6744°E

- Japan

Information
- Established: 1922

Showa Women's University Junior-Senior High School (昭和女子大学附属昭和中学校・高等学校, Shōwa Joshi Daigaku fuzoku Chūgakkō Kōtōgakkō) is a girls' junior and senior high school operated by Showa Women's University. It is within two separate buildings on the campus in Setagaya, Tokyo. As of 2019 the principal is Tomoko Kaneko.

1922 was its year of establishment of a five-year institute to enter Showa Women's University. A new junior high and high school opened in 1947 and 1948, respectively.

== See also ==
- List of high schools in Tokyo
