= Rikkyo Ikebukuro Junior and Senior High School =

Private boys' school in Ikebukuro, Tokyo

Coordinates: 35.7311°N 139.7022°E

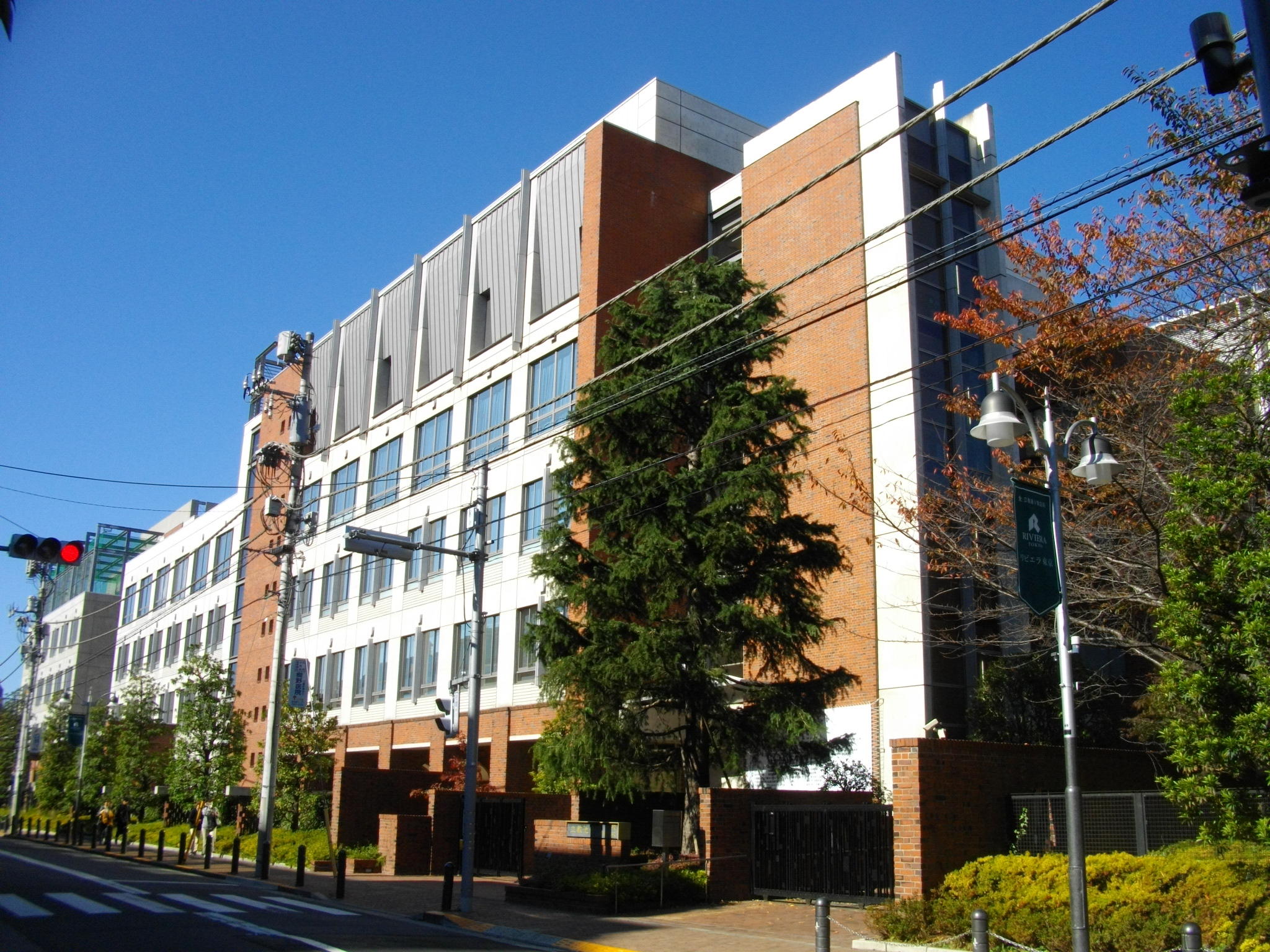
Rikkyo Ikebukuro Junior and Senior High School

Rikkyo Ikebukuro Junior and Senior High School (立教池袋中学校・高等学校) is a private boys' junior and senior high school in Ikebukuro, Toshima, Tokyo.

== History ==
Bishop Channing Moore Williams established Rikkyo Junior High School in Tsukiji, Tokyo in 1896. The original building was destroyed by the Great Kantō earthquake, so a new building in Ikebukuro opened in 1923. The school was re-established in the post-World War II period in 1948.

The school was renamed Rikkyo Ikebukuro Junior High School in 2000, and in the same year its senior high school division was established.

== Notable alumni ==
- Takeshi Takashina, Imperial Japanese Army general
- Hiroshi Sekiguchi, actor (middle school)
- Monta Mino, TV presenter (middle school)
- Oji Hiroi, author (middle school)
- Bokuzen Hidari, actor
- Jōtarō Kawakami, politician
- Masato Yokota, track and field athlete
- Yukihiro Takahashi, musician (middle school)
- Kento Misao, footballer

== See also ==
- List of high schools in Tokyo
