= Bunkyo University =

Private university in Shinagawa, Tokyo, Japan

Coordinates: 35°54′17.8″N 139°46′25.2″E

- 文教大学
- Type: Private
- Established: Founded 1927, Chartered 1966
- President: Michael Huissen
- Faculty: 221
- Administrative staff: 147
- Students: 8,699 (Koshigaya ~5050, Shonan ~3590)
- Undergraduates: 8166 (Internationals 138)
- Postgraduates: 110 (Internationals 19)
- Location: Japan
- Campus: Saitama, Kanagawa
- Website: www.bunkyo.ac.jp

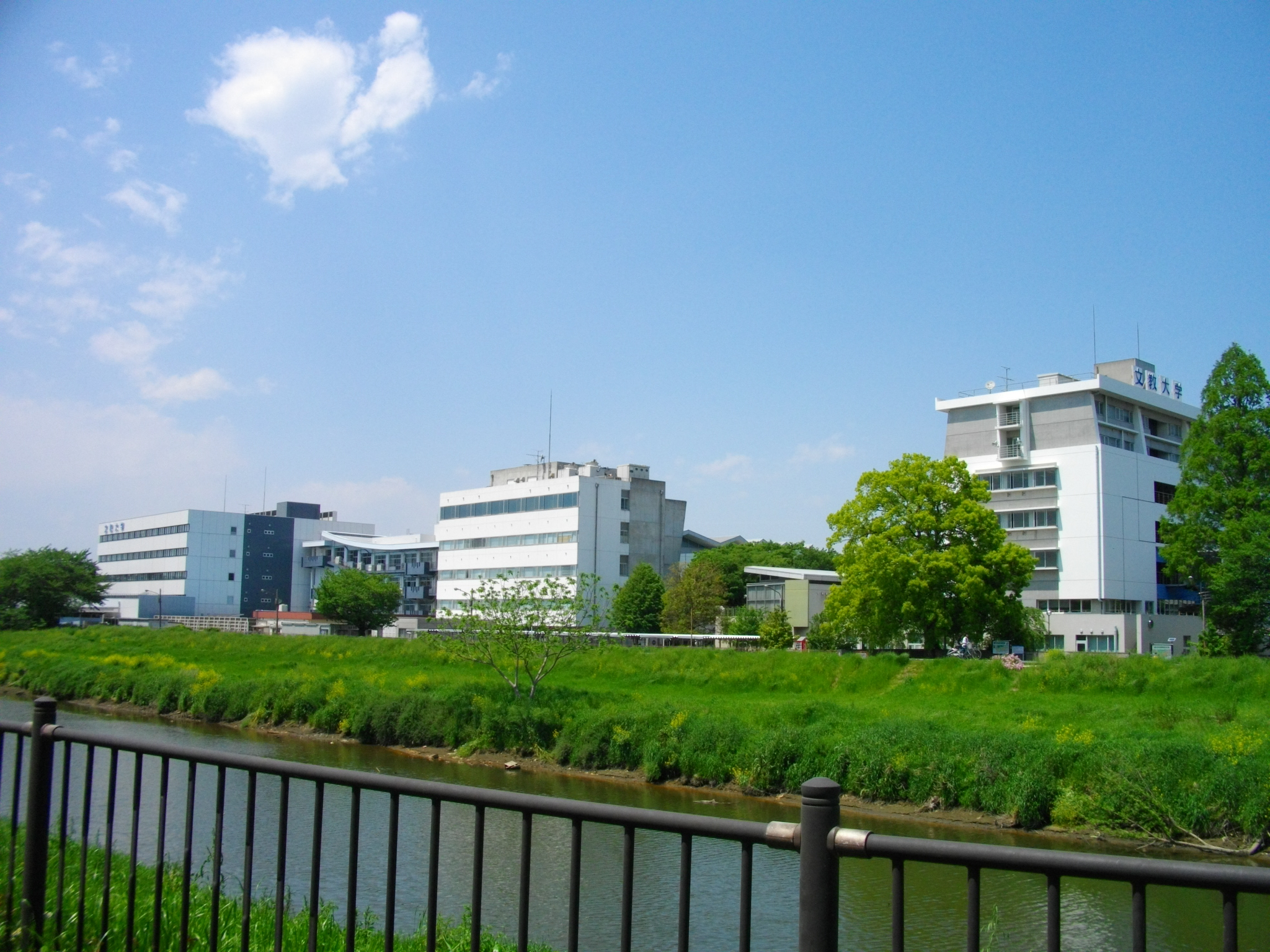
Koshigaya Campus

Bunkyo University (文教大学, Bunkyō Daigaku) is a private university located in Shinagawa, Tokyo, Japan, with campuses in Saitama and Kanagawa Prefecture.

The kanji of the word "Bunkyo" mean education and learning. The university offers courses mainly in education and research of the cultural and social sciences, and is well known for its teacher training. Previously the school was a girls' school called Rissho Women's University; when it became coeducational in 1976 its name was changed to Bunkyo University.

The university is an establishment of the Legal Educational Foundation, Bunkyo University Institute. There are two campuses: the Koshigaya Campus located in the city of Koshigaya, Saitama; and the Shonan Campus located in the city of Chigasaki, Kanagawa. Dormitories for both campuses are located in Kiyosato, Takane-town, Kitakoma district, Yamanashi Prefecture.

== History ==
In 1966, Rissho Women's University was established at the Koshigaya Campus in Koshigaya-city, Saitama-prefecture, Japan. The name was changed to Bunkyo University in 1976 and began educating male and female students the next year. The Rissho Institute Legal Educational Foundation, which established the university, changed its name to the Bunkyo University Institute Legal Education Foundation in 1983. The Shonan Campus was established in the city of Chigasaki, Kanagawa Prefecture, Japan in 1985.

== Timeline ==
- 1927 Rissho Kindergarten and Rissho Needlework School for Girls founded.
- 1928 Rissho Women's Vocational School founded.
- 1932 Rissho Institute High School for Girls founded.
- 1953 Rissho Institute Women's Junior College founded.
- 1966 Rissho Women's University founded; Koshigaya campus opened. Faculty of Home Economics Study established.
- 1969 Faculty of Education established.
- 1976 Faculty of Human Sciences established. University's name changed to Bunkyo University.
- 1977 Bunkyo University becomes coeducational.
- 1980 Faculty of Information and Communications established. Faculty of Home Economics Study eliminated.
- 1985 Shonan campus opened.
- 1987 Faculty of Language and Literature established.
- 1990 Faculty of International Study established.
- 1992 Special Postgraduate Course in education established.
- 1993 Bunkyo University Graduate School founded; School of Human Sciences (Master's Program) established. Special department course (foreign student program) established.
- 1999 School of Language and Culture (Master's Program) established in graduate school.
- 2000 Doctorate program added to School of Human Sciences in graduate school.
- 2005 School of Information Study established in graduate school.

=== Campus ===
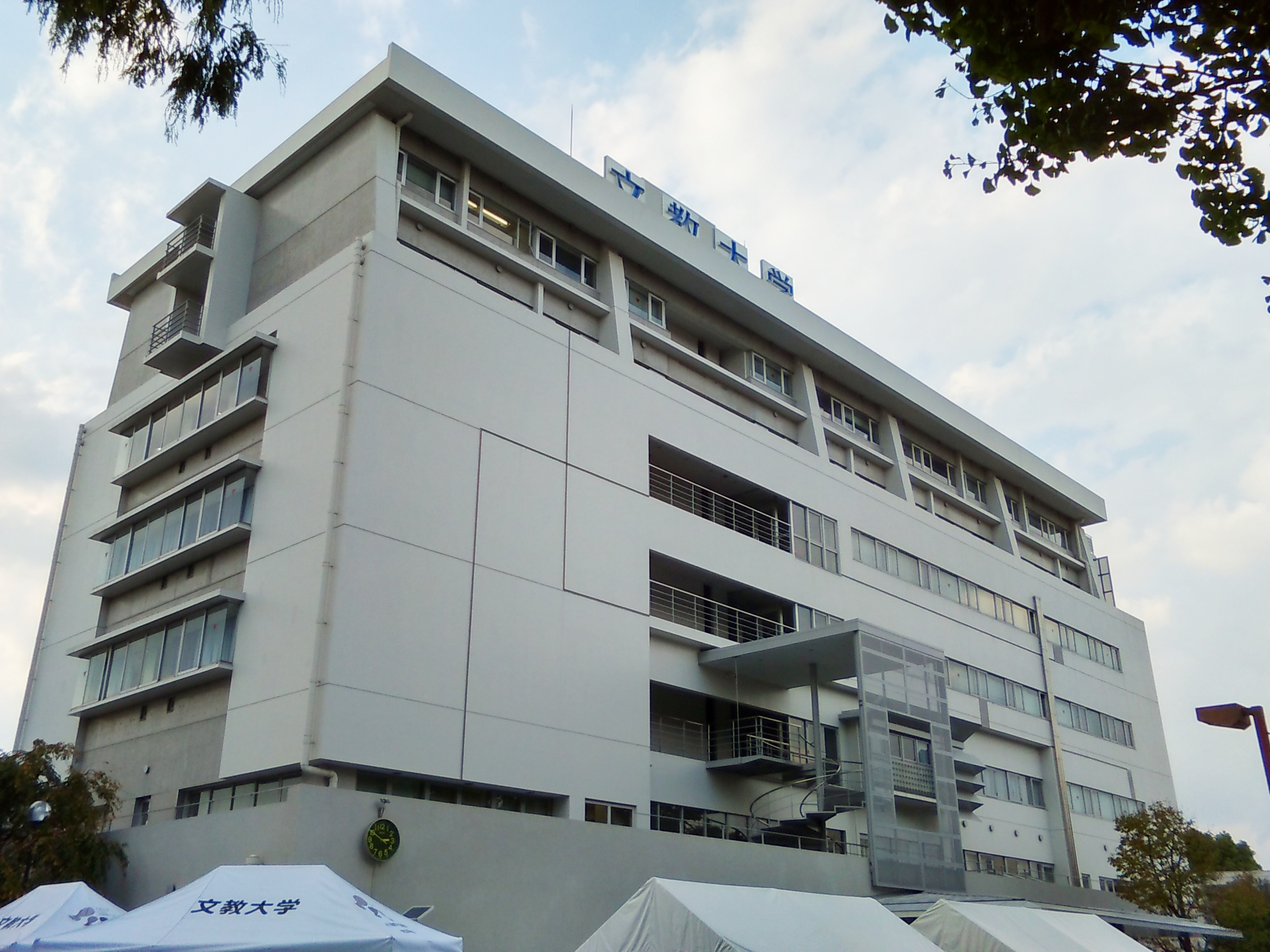
Administration office at Koshigaya Campus

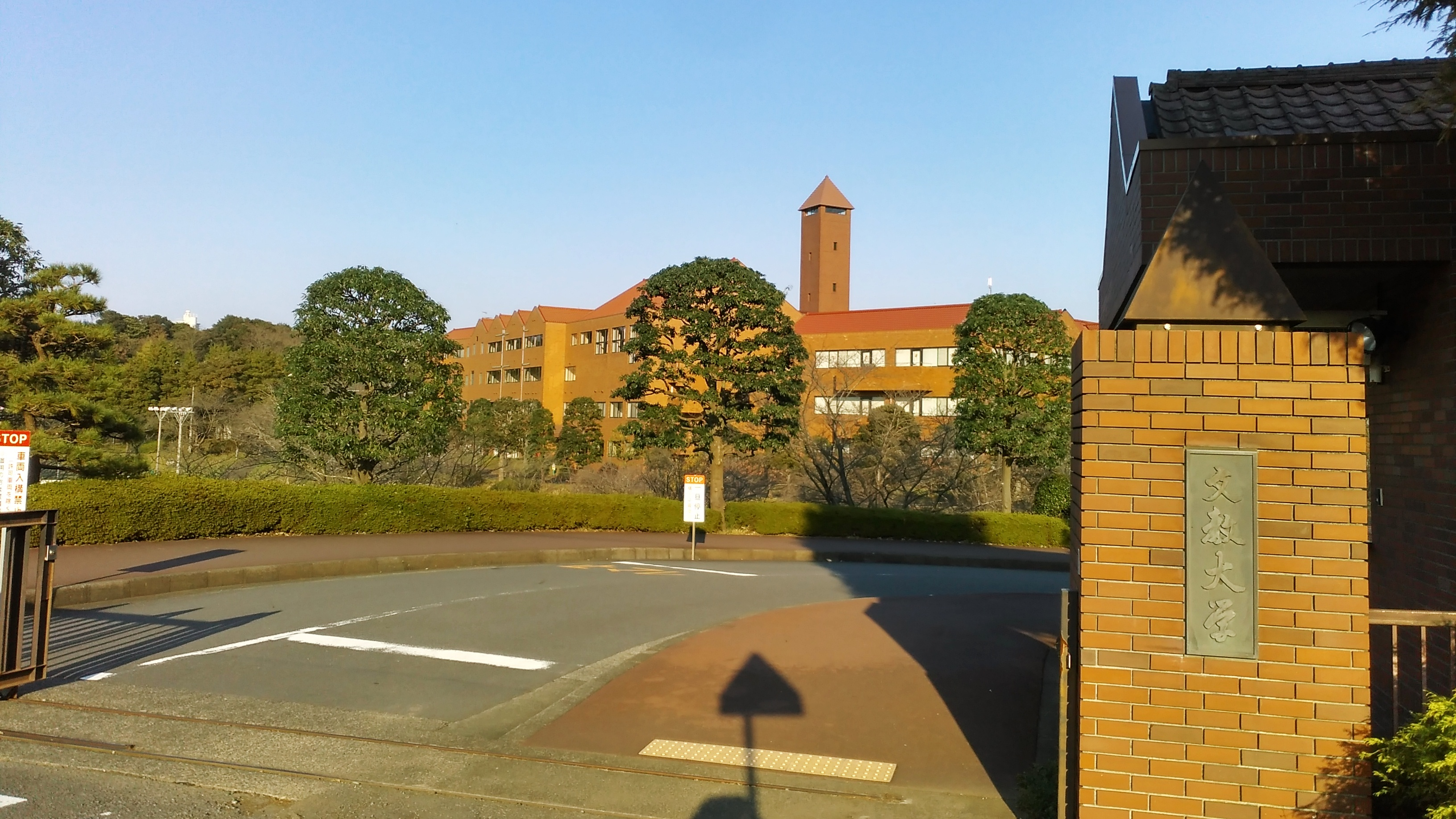
Shonan Campus

- Koshigaya Campus (South-Ogishima, Koshigaya-city, Saitama Prefecture, Japan)
  - Faculties: Faculty of Education, Faculty of Human Sciences, Faculty of Language and Literature
  - Graduate Schools: School of Human Sciences, School of Language and Culture
  - Special Postgraduate Course: Education Major
  - Special Department Course: Foreign Student Department
  - Research Institute: Institute of Clinical Counseling, Institute of Language and Culture, Institute of Living Science, Institute of Educational Research
  - Centers: Lifelong Learning Center, Information Center, Health Center
- Shonan Campus (Namegaya, Chigasaki-city, Kanagawa Prefecture, Japan)
  - Faculties: Faculty of Information and Communications, Faculty of International Studies
  - Graduate Schools: None
  - Special Postgraduate Course: None
  - Special Department Course: None
  - Research Institute: Shonan Research Institute
  - Centers: Information Center, Health Center

Bunkyo University Women's College is side by side with Bunkyo University in the Shonan campus.

=== Others ===
- Bunkyo University Secretariat Headquarters (Hatanodai, Shinagawa, Tokyo, Japan)
  - Centers: International Exchange Center, Entrance Center

The headquarters of the university secretariat for the Bunkyo University Institute Legal Educational Foundation are located at this site. The secretariat, the attached junior high school, the attached senior high school, and the Bunkyo University Institute's kindergarten are all located at this campus.

- Bunkyo University Institute's Mountain Yatsugatake Dormitory (Kiyosato, Takane-town, Kitakoma-district, Yamanashi-prefecture, Japan)

The common dormitory for all schools of the Bunkyo University Institute Legal Education Foundation is located in Kiyosato.

== Organization of Education and Research ==
Bunkyo University's main academic focus is the social sciences. Academic offerings include courses in pedagogy/education studies, human science/human studies, literature and linguistics/language studies, informatics/information studies and communication studies, and international studies. Bunkyo University is a comprehensive university, and there are five faculties, twelve departments/courses, two graduate courses, three special postgraduate courses and one special department course. Bunkyo offers no courses in the natural sciences.

== Faculties, Departments and Courses ==
- Faculty of Education
  - School Education Course
    - Japanese Language Major
    - Social Studies Major
    - Mathematics Major
    - Natural Science Major
    - Music Major
    - Fine Arts Major
    - Physical Education Major
    - Home Economics Major
    - Special Education Major
  - Psychology - Pedagogy Integrated Course
    - Childhood Major
    - Early Childhood Major
- Faculty of Human Sciences
  - Department of Human Sciences
    - Psychology Course
    - Social Culture Course
    - Social Welfare Course
    - Health Psychology Course
  - Department of Clinical Psychology
- Faculty of Language and Literature
  - Department of Japanese Language and Literature
  - Department of English Language and Literature
  - Department of Chinese Language and Literature
- Faculty of Information and Communications
  - Department of Public Relations
  - Department of Business and Information
  - Department of Information Systems
- Faculty of International Studies
  - Department of International Communications
    - Cross-Cultural Communication Course
    - Environmental Studies Course
  - Department of International Relations
    - International cooperation in Politics and Economics Course
    - International Hospitality and Business Management Course

=== Graduate Schools, Major ===
- School of Human Sciences
  - Clinical Psychology (Master's Program and Doctoral Program)
  - Lifelong Learning Major (Master's Program)
- School of Language and Culture
  - Language and Culture Major (Master's Program)
    - Area Culture Majors
    - Trilingual Majors

=== Special Postgraduate Course ===
- Education Major
  - Advanced Education Specialist Program

=== Special Department Course ===
- Foreign Student Department

=== Junior College ===
Although the junior college is not an organization of Bunkyo University, it is located on the Bunkyo University Shonan campus and is closely affiliated with Bunkyo.

- Women's College
  - Department of Health and Nutrition

== Institutions ==
There are institutions on the campus such as libraries, research institutes, and various centers.

=== Libraries ===
University libraries are located on each campus. The Bunkyo University Shonan library is also associated with Bunkyo University Women's College.

- Bunkyo University Library
  - Bunkyo University's Koshigaya Library (collection of about 330,000 volumes)
  - Bunkyo University's Shonan Library (collection of about 230,000 volumes)

=== Research Institutes ===
There are three university research institutes and two graduate school research institutes. All research institutes of Bunkyo University (graduate school institutes included) are located at the Koshigaya Campus except the Shonan Research Institute at Shonan Campus.

- University research institute
  - Institute of Clinical Counseling
  - Institute of Language and Culture
- Graduate school research institute
  - Institute of Living Science
  - Institute of Educational Research
  - Shonan Research Institute

=== Center ===
There are various university centers. The Lifelong Learning Center is located on the Koshigaya Campus, the International Exchange Center and the Entrance Center are located in Hatanodai at the campus of the university secretariat, and Information Centers and Health Centers are located on both campuses.

- Lifelong Learning Center
- International Exchange Center
- Information Center
- Health Center
- Entrance Center

== Attached schools ==
Model schools attached to the university offer a complete education from kindergarten through graduate school. The elementary school is located in Ishikawadai, and the other schools are located in Hatanodai.

- Bunkyo University Institute Kindergarten (Hatanodai)
- Bunkyo University Elementary School (Ishikawadai)
- Bunkyo University Junior High School (Hatanodai)
- Bunkyo University Senior High School (Hatanodai)
