= Kaisei Academy =

Private secondary school in Tokyo, Japan

Coordinates: 35°43′57″N 139°45′54″E

- 開成学園 (Kaisei Gakuen)
- Arakawa, Tokyo, Japan

Information
- Type: Private
- Established: 1871
- Headmaster: Tsutomu Nomizu
- Grades: 7–12
- Enrollment: 2,100
- Website: www.kaiseigakuen.jp (in Japanese)

Kaisei Academy (Japanese: 開成学園, Kaisei Gakuen) is a private secondary school for boys located in Arakawa, Tokyo.

== Overview ==
Kaisei Academy admits approximately 300 students to its junior high school and 400 to its high school each year. The school's motto is a tradition of 質実剛健 (shitsujitsugouken), a yojijukugo Japanese phrase meaning "strong and simple". Its English motto is "The pen is mightier than the sword".

== History ==
The school was founded in 1871 by Sano Kanae, a lecturer of Western studies, gunnery, and oceanography. Initially established as Kyōryū Academy (共立学校), the school was closed after Sano's death in 1877. In 1878, the school was reopened, and Takahashi Korekiyo, then a professor, became the first principal of the restructured institution, transforming it into a preparatory boarding school. In 1879, 112 out of 466 students were admitted to university.

The school was renamed Kaisei Academy in 1895.

== Notable alumni ==
- Keisuke Okada, (1868–1952) Prime Minister (1934–1936)
- Kikunae Ikeda, (1864–1936) Chemist who identified umami
- Hantaro Nagaoka, (1865–1950) Physicist who proposed the Saturnian model of the atom
- Masaoka Shiki, (1867–1902) Poet, one of the "four great masters" of haiku
- Tōson Shimazaki, (1872–1943) Poet and author, a leading figure in Meiji Romanticism
- Akiyama Saneyuki, (1868–1918) Admiral, planner of the Japanese strategy at the Battle of Tsushima
- Chikahiko Koizumi, (1884-1945) Surgeon Vice-General of Japan
- Tamon Yamaguchi, (1892–1942) Vice Admiral, commander of the aircraft carrier Hiryū at the Battle of Midway
- Toshirō Mutō, (born 1943) Former Deputy Governor of the Bank of Japan
- Fumio Kishida, (born 1957) Prime Minister (2021–2024)
- Takayuki Kobayashi, (born 1974) Chairman of the Policy Research Council in the Liberal Democratic Party
- Keisuke Suzuki, (born 1977) Minister of Justice (2024–2025)

== See also ==
- List of high schools in Tokyo
