= Seigakuin Junior & Senior High School =

Private secondary school in Kita, Tokyo, Japan

Coordinates: 35.7406°N 139.7509°E

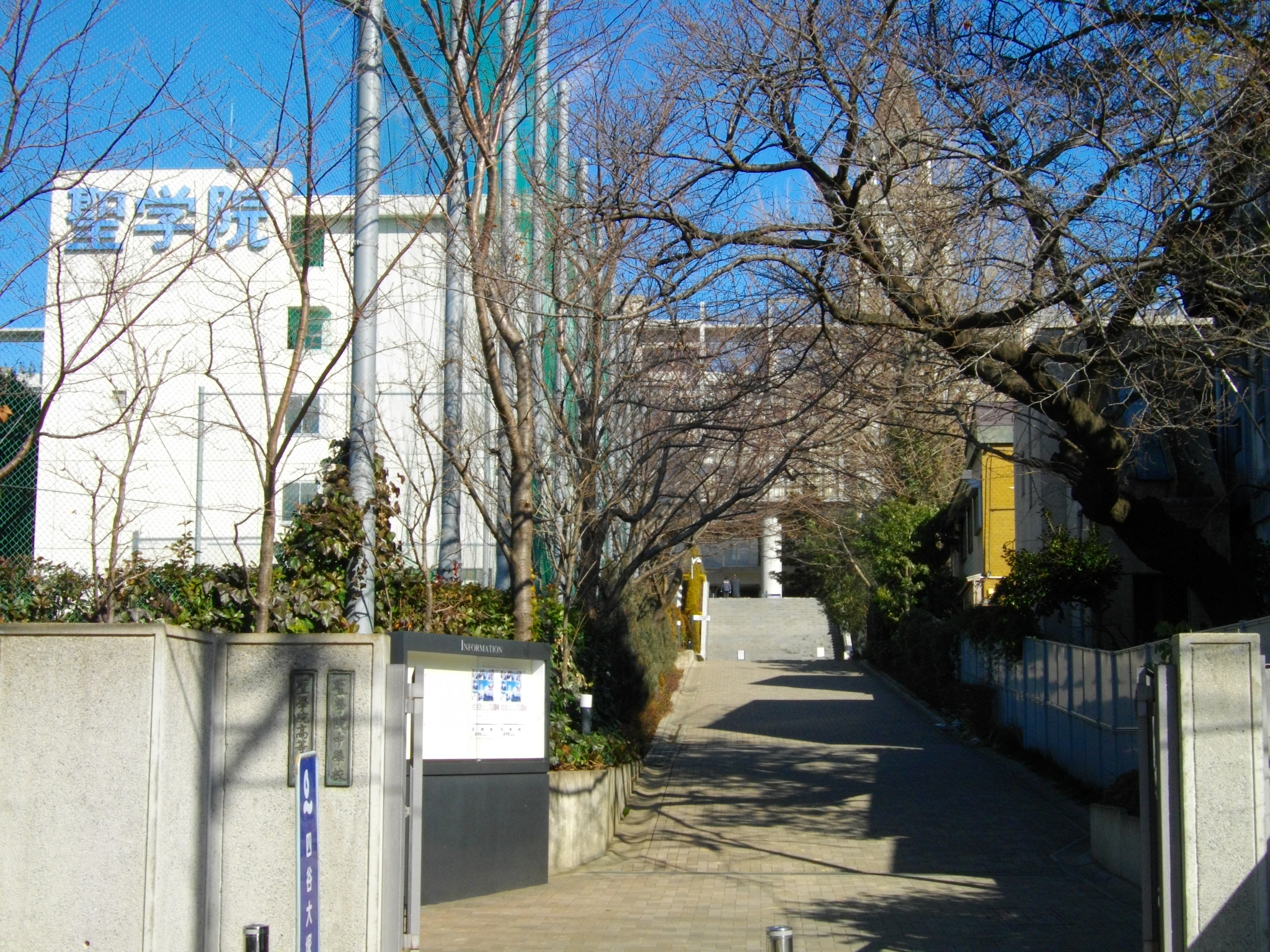
Seigakuin Junior & Senior High School

Seigakuin Junior & Senior High School (聖学院中学校・高等学校, Seigakuin Chūgakkō Kōtōgakkō) is a private Christian secondary school in Nakazato, Kita, Tokyo. It is a part of the Seigakuin educational group.

== See also ==
- List of high schools in Tokyo
