= Gyosei Junior and Senior High School =

- 暁星中学校・高等学校 (Gyōsei Chūgakkō Kōtōgakkō)
- Tokyo; Japan

Information
- Type: Private
- Motto: 十全為始 隨之而美
- Religious affiliation: Roman Catholic
- Opened: 1888
- Principal: Takada Hirokazu (髙田裕和）
- Gender: Boys
- Age: 12 to 18
- Website: www.gyosei-h.ed.jp

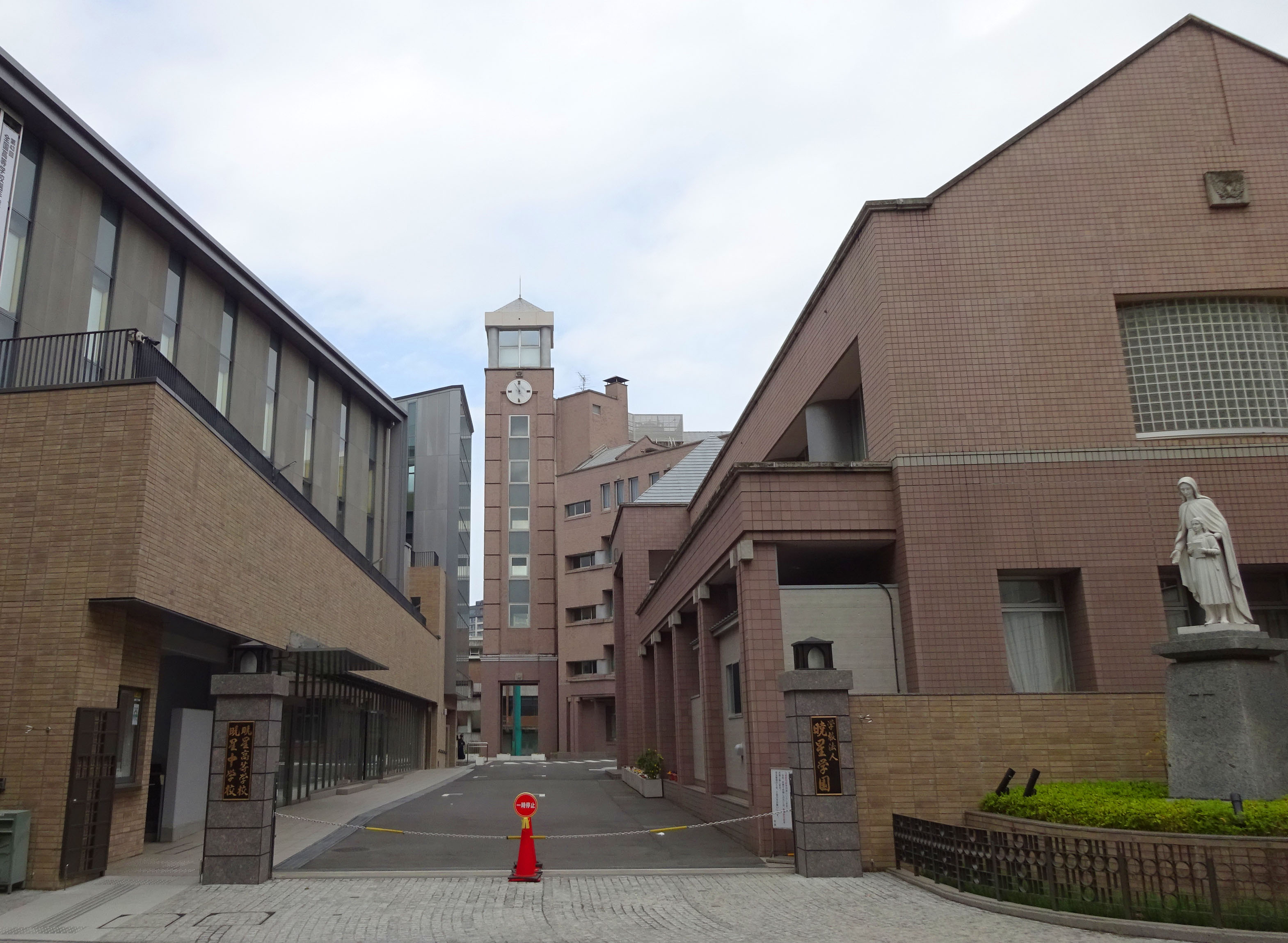
Gyosei Junior and Senior High School

Gyosei Junior and Senior High School (暁星中学校・高等学校, Gyōsei Chūgakkō Kōtōgakkō) is a private Catholic junior and senior high school for boys in Fujimi, Chiyoda, Tokyo. It is part of a family of Catholic schools administered by the Gyosei Gakuen Educational Association which includes a kindergarten and elementary school.

== History ==
After Pierre-Marie Osouf became the new Bishop of Tokyo, he convinced the Society of Mary (Marianists) that there was a need for Catholic schools in Japan. The order responded generously and sent American and French missionaries, who founded Gyosei High School in Tsukiji, Tokyo in 1888. The school was affected by the devastating 1923 Great Kantō earthquake and then World War II some twenty years later. It later moved to its (as of 2002) present location in Chiyoda, Tokyo.

The high school is the oldest of a family of schools located within walking distance of each other and includes a coeducational kindergarten (opened 1969) and an all-boys elementary school founded in 1890, thus providing a comprehensive education for boys from ages 3 to 18. It has a special relationship with the Jesuit-run Sophia University: Gyosei High School graduates often continue on to Sophia University and it recruits religious studies teachers from the university.

Saint Joseph College in Yokohama was founded as a division of Gyosei High School before becoming a separately-run international school. It has since closed amidst much controversy.

In 1979 Gyosei International School was opened as the sister school to cater to the expatriate population. It is administered separately from Gyosei Gakuen.

== Curriculum ==
French and English are the main foreign languages taught, the former having been taught at the school since its foundation. For a period of time, the French Baccalauréat was offered.

== Alumni ==
- Mitsuharu Kaneko – Poet/ Painter
- Yohji Yamamoto – Fashion designer
- Takeo Kikuchi – Fashion designer
- Yoshitaro Nomura – Film director
- Matsumoto Koshirō X – Kabuki performer/ Actor
- Ichikawa Ennosuke IV – Kabuki performer/ Actor
- Nakamura Kanzaburō XVIII- Kabuki performer/ Actor
- Nakamura Kichiemon II- Kabuki performer/ Actor/ Costume designer
- Matsumoto Hakuō II – Kabuki performer/ Actor
- Teruyuki Kagawa – Kabuki performer/ Actor
- Chiyonosuke Azuma – Actor/ Nippon buyō dancer
- Tatsuo Matsumura – Actor
- Kin'ya Kitaōji – Jidaigeki actor
- Tōru Minegishi – Actor
- Shunji Fujimura – Actor
- Ayana Tsubaki – TV personality/ Fashion model
- Kento Kaku – Actor
- Takehiro Hira – Actor
- Kentaro Ishikawa – Professional soccer player
- Satoshi Okura – Professional soccer player
- Takayuki Fujikawa – Professional soccer player
- Yoshiyuki Kato – Professional soccer player
- Kengo Tanaka – Professional soccer player
- Ryoichi Maeda – Professional soccer player
- Kotaro Inaba – Professional futsal player
- Wataru Kitahara – Professional futsal player
- Shota Hoshi – Professional futsal player
- Yoshitaka Hori – CEO of Horipro
- Kinnichi Shida – CEO of Shidax
- Shunpei Terakawa – TV Asahi sport reporter
- Hirotaka Toba – Nippon Television producer
- Shirō Sagisu – Music composer
- Minao Shibata – Music composer
- Yoritsune Matsudaira – Music composer
- Makoto Moroi – Music composer
- Hideo Saito – Cellist/ Music composer
- Kazumi Watanabe – Guitarist
- Motoki Tokieda – Professor of Japanese linguistics at University of Tokyo
- Ken'ichi Yoshida – Author/ Literary critic
- Ōmi Komaki – Writer/ Translator of French literature
- Ryō Kurusu – Officer in the Imperial Japanese Army
- Imao Hirano – Writer/ Translator of French literature `(withdrew)

== See also ==
- List of high schools in Tokyo
- Gyosei International School, originally affiliated with this school
