= Wayo Women's University =

Private women's college in Ichikawa, Chiba, Japan

Coordinates: 35°44′32.23″N 139°54′14.29″E

- 和洋女子大学; Wayō joshi daigaku
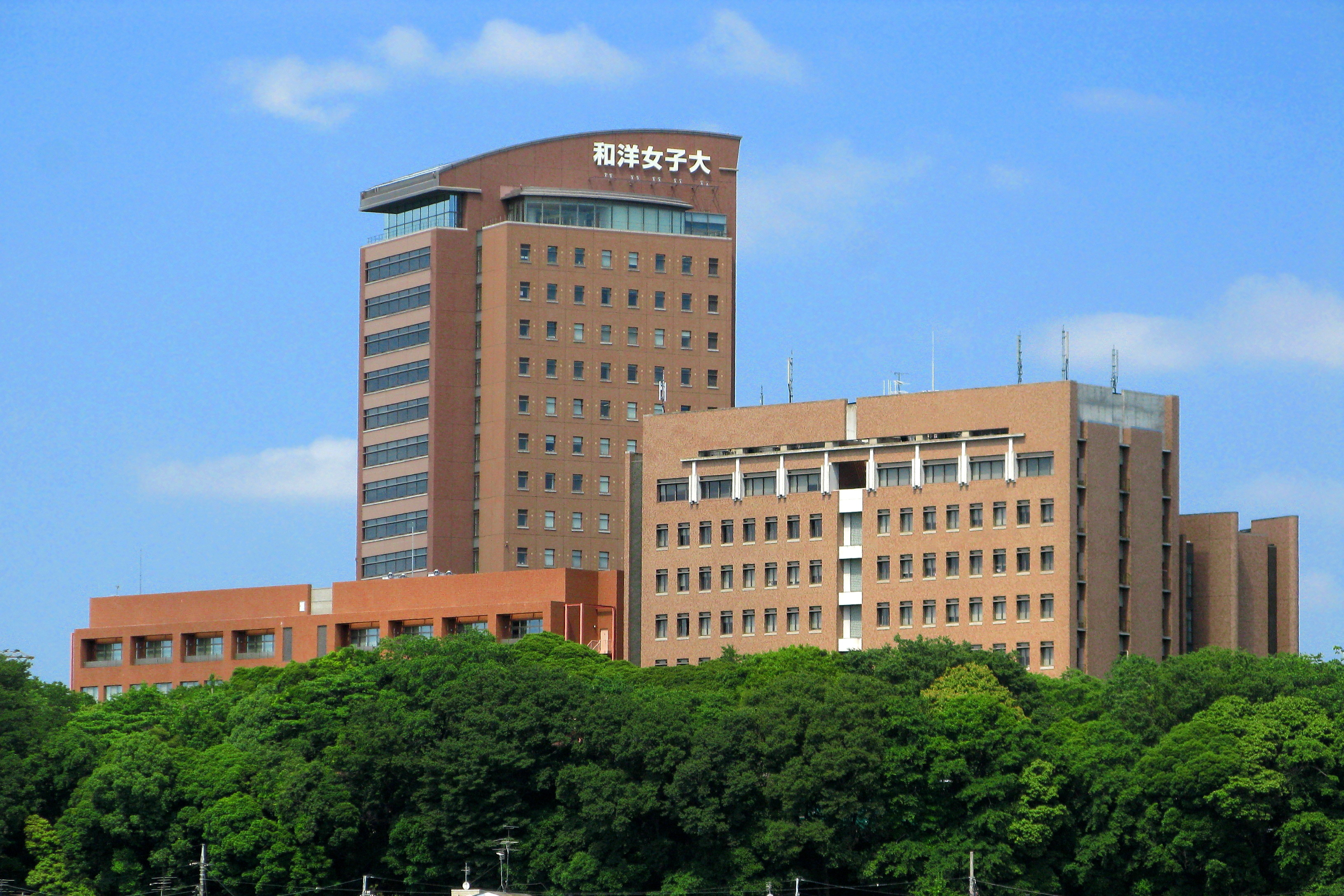
- Type: Private
- Established: 1897
- Location: Ichikawa, Chiba, Japan
- Website: www.wayo.ac.jp

Wayō Women's University (和洋女子大学, Wayō joshi daigaku) is a private women's college in Ichikawa, Chiba, Japan. The predecessor of the school was founded in 1897, and it was chartered as a university in 1949.
