= Shirayuri University =

Catholic women's university in Tokyo, Japan

Coordinates: 35°40′08.71″N 139°34′50.78″E

- 白百合女子大学
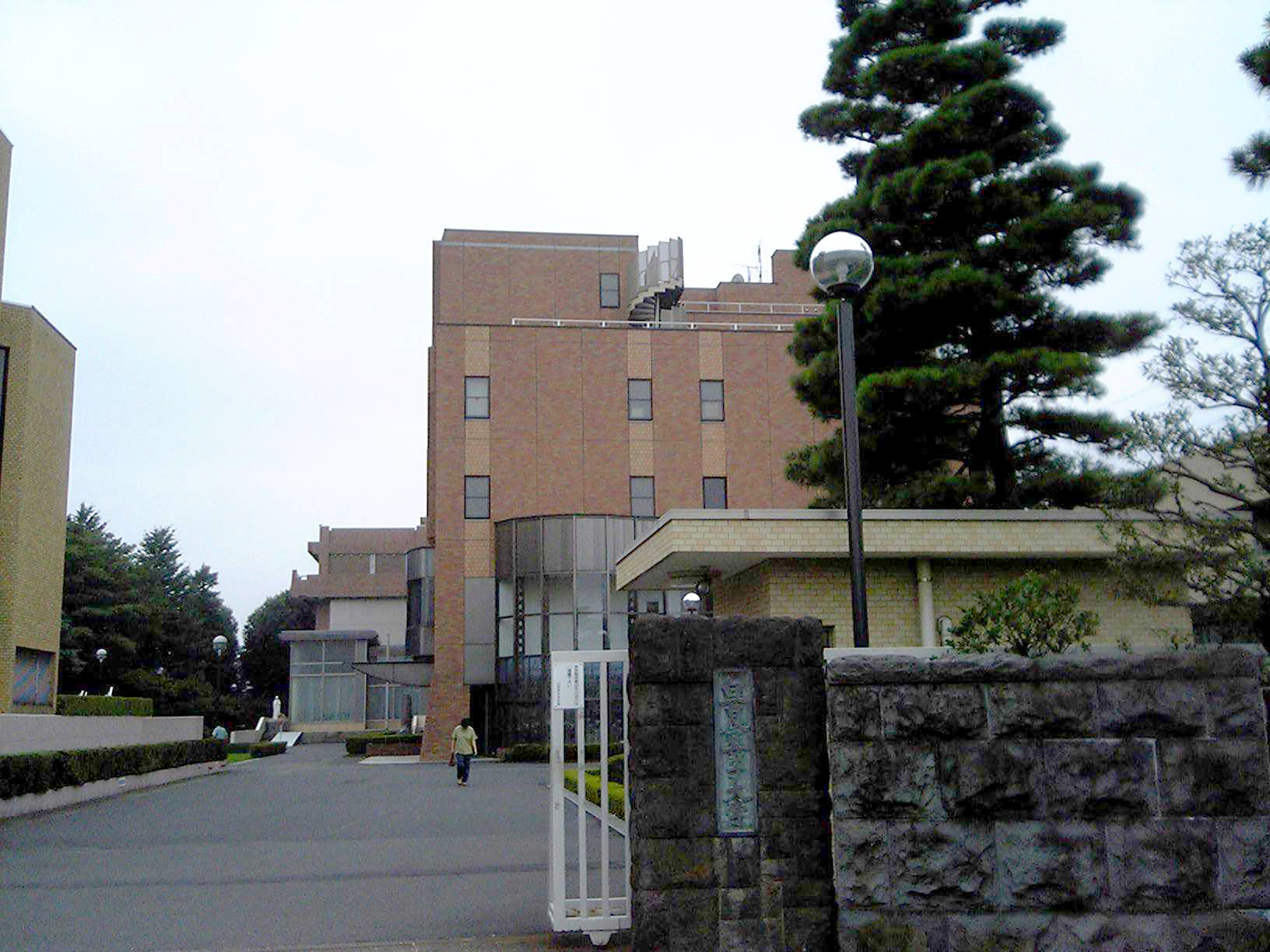
- Type: Private
- Established: 1881, chartered as four-year university in 1965
- Affiliations: Roman Catholic Church
- Location: Chōfu, Tokyo, Japan
- Website: www.shirayuri.ac.jp

Shirayuri University (白百合女子大学, Shirayuri Joshi Daigaku) is a Catholic Japanese women's university in Chōfu, Tokyo. The university comprises four Departments of Literature and a graduate school. This all-female institution is well known as Shirayuri Women's University, although its official name is Shirayuri College. It is a research and liberal arts college. It was formed by three nuns and a priest from France.

== History ==
Shirayuri University traces its origin to the Convent of Saint Paul Chartre, which was founded in a small village in France at the end of the 17th century. Ever since its founding the sisterhood, with its headquarters in Rome, has taken service and education as its mission and has devoted itself to education and welfare activities all over the world.

Activities in Japan began with the arrival of three French nuns in Hakodate, in 1878, with an ardent mission to establish a convent. Three years later, a school was founded in Kanda, Tokyo, beginning the groundwork for Shirayuri Gakuen. In 1965, the present Shirayuri College, a four-year institution, was established.

== School mission ==
The president of the university mentions that the school's goal is "to pursue truth, polish their [student's] intellect, learn to empathize with other, know the joys of serving others and deepen their awareness of the true beauty of all the natural things and happenings which surround them."

== School system ==
The university can be a continuation of Shirayuri Pre-school, Shirayuri Elementary School, and Shirayuri Middle/High School. Students can first enter Shirayuri Pre-school and continue their education till graduating the university (20% of the students stay till college). Many begin their Shirayuri education in the university.

== Organisation ==
Shirayuri has two undergraduate faculties. The Faculty of Liberal Arts contains the following departments:

- Japanese Language and Literature
- French Language and Literature
- English Language and Literature

The Faculty of Human Studies contains the following departments:

- Children's Culture
- Developmental Psychology
- Child Care and Primary Education

There is also a graduate school offering Masters and Doctoral programs in conjunction with the departments.

== Culture ==
The emblem depicts a fleur-de-lys holding a sword. Since it is a French-related mission school, the Sister who takes care of the college is referred to by the students as 'Masul' or "Ma Soeur" (i.e., " My Sister" in French).

It is a very small school with homeroom classes that are led by the Sisters. Although there is a strong impression that it is a school for upper-class girls, it could be seen as a place where classes and good manners are taught strictly rather than as a place where children of wealthy families flock. Since the campus transferred in 1965, it owns modern school buildings and a chapel.

Their sister school is Sendai Shirayuri Women's College.
