= Japanese Indian =

Indian Japanese or Japanese Indian may be:

- India–Japan relations
- Japanese people in India
- Japanese language education in India
- Indians in Japan
