= Saichiro Misumi =

Japanese indologist (1916–2018)

- 三角 佐一郎
- Born: 16 June 1916; Japan
- Died: 23 February 2018 (aged 101); Tokyo, Japan
- Occupations: World War II veteran, indologist
- Known for: India Japan relations
- Awards: Padma Bhushan

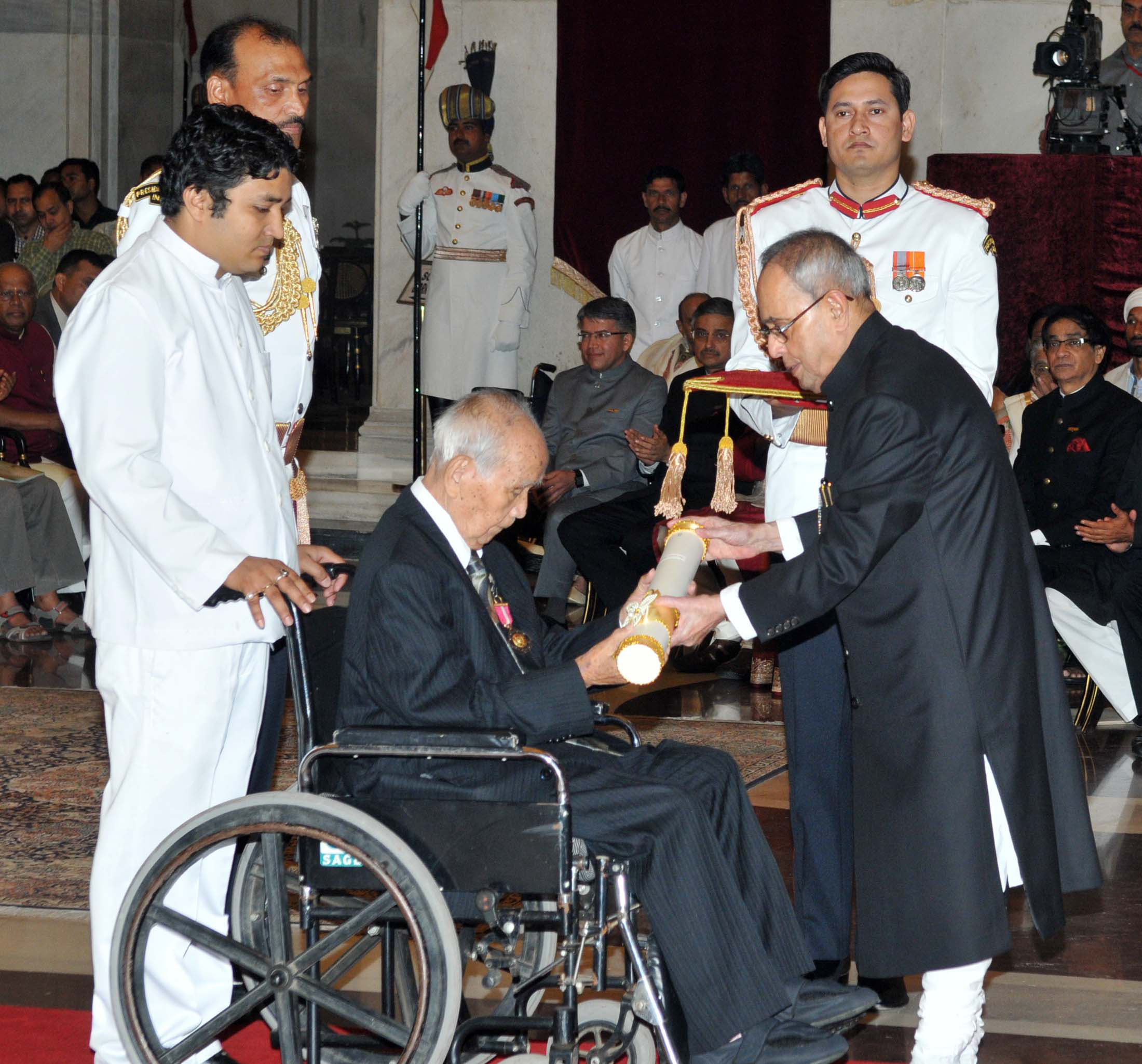
The President, Pranab Mukherjee presenting the Padma Bhushan Award to Saichiro Misumi, at a Civil Investiture Ceremony, at Rashtrapati Bhavan, in New Delhi on March 30, 2015

Saichiro Misumi (Misumi, Saichirō (三角 佐一郎) 16 June 1916 – 23 February 2018) was a Japanese indologist, former executive director and the incumbent advisor of the Japan-India Association. He is a World War II veteran, a former Indian National Army officer and an associate of Subhash Chandra Bose, renowned Indian nationalist. Narendra Modi, the Indian Prime Minister, visited him on 2 September 2014 during the former's official visit to Japan and the meeting was widely covered in Indian media. The Ministry of External Affairs, India have drawn up a project to record Misumi's life and times by way of a documentary film, for which they have invited expression of interest. He was honoured by the Government of India in 2015 with the Padma Bhushan, the third highest Indian civilian award for his contributions towards promoting India-Japan relations.

== See also ==
- Subash Chandra Bose
- Indian National Army
- India Japan relations
- Japan-India Association
