= Liman Kati =

Village in Kuala Kangsar, Malaysia

Coordinates: 4°51′N 100°54′E

Liman Kati is a new village on the outskirts of Kuala Kangsar, outside Perak, Malaysia. The primary livelihood is from rubber plantations. The community is mostly made up of Malays, Chinese, and Indians, with the majority of Chinese descent who work as rubber tappers and grocers.

== Education ==
Liman National Type (Chinese) School is a primary school in the village. An alternative primary school is SRJK Tsung Wah, located in Kuala Kangsar, a nearby town. For secondary school education, residents generally study in Kuala Kangsar. SMJK Tsung Wah is the most common choice of secondary school.

Liman Kati is home to the Sultan Azlan Shah MRSM, formerly known as the Kuala Kangsar Mara Junior Science College (MRSM).

== Demographics ==
The majority of the population in the village is Chinese, followed by Malays, Indians, and others who married native residents or workers.

== Economy ==
The rubber plantations are the main source of income. Products include rubber, oil palm, fruits (durian, rambutan, papaya), and vegetables.
