= Embassy of Japan, New Delhi =

Diplomatic mission in India

- Address: 50-G Shantipath, Chanakyapuri, New Delhi, Delhi 110021
- Coordinates: 28°35′24.3″N 77°11′18.1″E
- Opened: 1952
- Ambassador: Keiichi Ono
- Jurisdiction: India; Bhutan
- Website: Official website

Embassy of Japan in New Delhi is the diplomatic mission of the State of Japan to India. Since November 2024, Keiichi Ono has been the ambassador.

== History ==
- On 12 April 1952, prior to the coming independence of Japan, the Japanese National Diet enacted the "Act of Determination of the Names and Locations of the Diplomatic Missions," which stipulates to establish the Embassy in New Delhi.
- On 28 April 1952, Japan became independent due to the entry into force of the Treaty of San Francisco, while India is not a signatory to the treaty; however, the "Act of Determination of the Names and Locations of the Diplomatic Missions" came into effect in Japan.
- On 9 June 1952, the Treaty of Peace Between Japan and India was signed.
- On 27 August 1952, the Japan–India Peace Treaty came into effect with establishment of diplomatic relations between Japan and India, and the Embassy of Japan in New Delhi was officially approved by India.
- In September 1971, Japan granted an implied approval of Bhutan as a sovereign state.
- In March 1986, diplomatic relations between Japan and Bhutan was established.
- Embassy of Japan in New Delhi began to be in charge of the Embassy of Japan to Bhutan.

== Address ==
Plot No.4 & 5, 50-G Shantipath, Chanakyapuri, New Delhi 110021

== Notable officials ==
- Otohiko Endo: Komeito Member of the House of Representatives
- Shunichi Kuryu: 27th National Police Agency Commissioner

== See also ==
- India–Japan relations
- List of diplomatic missions of: India | Japan
- List of diplomatic missions in: India | Japan
- Foreign relations: India | Japan
