= Japanese people in India =

Japanese people in India 在インド日本人 Zai Indo Nihonjin
Total population
- 8,145 (October 2022)

Regions with significant populations
- Chennai · Bangalore · Kolkata · Gurgaon · New Delhi · Visakhapatnam

Languages
- Indian Languages · English · Japanese

Religion
- Mahayana Buddhism · Shinto · Christianity

Related ethnic groups
- Japanese diaspora

There is a small Japanese community in India (在インド日本人, Zai Indo Nihonjin) which consists mainly of expatriates from Japan or Indian-born people of Japanese ancestry.

== Settlement ==
=== Bangalore ===
In Bangalore, the Japanese community has increased by approximately 3,000 in the last few years. The vast majority of the community works for Toyota Kirloskar, Honda, Fujitsu, Komatsu, Hitachi, Tsujikawa, Keihin, and 80 other Japanese corporates. Bangalore attracts over 1,800 Japanese business visitors every month. The Karnataka government has announced to set up an industrial township on 1,000 acres of land outside Bangalore for Japanese manufacturers. The Department of Foreign Languages at Bangalore University teaches Japanese. Bangalore has a Japanese-influenced Sakra World Hospital, a Kenkos store for lifestyle products.

The Japanese Association of Bengaluru runs a Japanese Supplementary School Hoshū jugyō kō or (補習授業校), or hoshūkō (補習校) in the premises of Trio World Academy. which is a Japanese-friendly school.

Japan Habba (Japan Festival) has been held in Bangalore since 2005 and about 1,000 Japanese people from various parts of India travel to Bangalore to join in the festival. Many Japanese restaurants exist in Bangalore, and some are owned by Japanese people.

=== Chennai ===
Chennai is home to the largest Japanese community in India around 8,200 members. Chennai has traditionally respected and valued Japanese culture and discipline. As of 2015, around 577 Japanese companies are present in Chennai, which represents more than a third of the Japanese companies in India. Japanese language centers have sprung up and American International School, Chennai has opened a center that teaches the language; there are about 55 Japanese restaurants while hotels continue to add Japanese cuisine to their menus. The Japanese influence in the city has resulted in a keen interest in the Japanese language among the people of Chennai, who learn it to better understand Japanese culture and the language's traditional linguistic similarity to Tamil, the official language of Tamil Nadu. Some also learn Japanese to explore new business opportunities. The Indo-Japan Chamber of Commerce and Industry (IJCCI) aims to increase cultural competence between India and Japan. They regularly host Japanese cultural events to expose the Chennai community to an otherwise unknown culture. Chennai has the largest number of JLPT test takers among the cities that offer the test in India.

The number of Japanese expatriates is expected to rise with the development of a 1500-acre Japanese township on the outskirts of Chennai.

=== Haldia ===
The Japanese community of Haldia is mostly engineers and top executives at Mitsubishi Chemicals Corporation's (MCC) PTA (Purified Terephthalic Acid) plant in the city. The community have been living in the mini Japanese township called Sataku (Japantown) for many years. Sataku has many Japanese restaurants and a local Japanese news station. Japanese movies are also shown in local theaters. Haldia is the only Indian city to have a Japantown.

The only problem for tourists to this Japantown is that it is not open to public. You need to be invited as a guest of one of the residents to gain entry to the complex. Also, the exact location is not available on Google Maps and not known to most locals or local traffic police. It is located in the Huzur tehsil and the Phanda block. According to the 2011 census of India, Haldia Sataku has a population of 1,814 people.

The commissioning of the PTA plant, and subsequent expansions have seen the arrival of many Japanese executives. While a few have returned, many stayed back. The next phase of expansion may bring more Japanese expatriates to Haldia.

=== Gujarat ===
There were 321 Japanese establishments and 347 Japanese citizens residing in Gujarat as of March 2019.

== Education ==
Locations of Japanese international schools, day and supplementary, in India recognized by MEXT (gray dots represent closed schools)

List of Japanese international schools in India:

- Mumbai Japanese School
- Japanese School New Delhi

Supplementary programmes (hoshu jugyo ko or hoshuko):

- Japanese School of Bangalore (バンガロール日本人補習授業校 Bangarōru Nihonjin Hoshū Jugyō Kō)
- Japanese School Educational Trust of Chennai (チェンナイ補習授業校 Chennai Hoshū Jugyō Kō) - located at American International School Chennai, Taramani. Established by the Japanese Association in Chennai (チェンナイ日本人会 Chennai Nihonjin Kai), it opened in June 1975 as the Japanese Class of Madras (マドラス日本語補習教室 Madorasu Nihongo Hoshū Kyōshitsu). In 1998 the school adopted the name Japanese Language School of Chennai (チェンナイ日本語補習校 Chennai Nihongo Hoshū Jugyō Kō) since Madras took the name Chennai. The school moved to AIS Chennai in 2003. It adopted its current name in 2005 so it could register as a trust, as per the Trust Act.

The Calcutta Japanese School (カルカタ日本人学校 Karukata Nihonjin Gakkō), a day school was established but not longer exists. The hoshuko in Kolkata also closed.

== Notable people ==
- Arata Izumi (和泉新) - Indian national footballer (Originally from Shimonoseki, Yamaguchi, Japan)
- Ashok Sukumaran - Japanese-born Indian contemporary artist (Originally from Sapporo, Hokkaido, Japan)
- Surai Sasai (佐々井秀嶺) - Japanese-born Indian Buddhist bhikkhu (monk) (Originally from Niimi, Okayama, Japan)
- Katsumi Yusa (遊佐 克美) - Footballer (Originally from Fukushima, Fukushima, Japan)
- Kimiko Yanagida (柳田紀美子) - Odissi Dancer
- Masako Ono (小野 雅子) - Japanese Odissi dancer (Originally from Tokyo, Japan)
- Ryuji Sueoka (末岡 龍二) - Footballer (Originally from Hikari, Yamaguchi, Japan)
- Takayuki Omi (近江 孝行) - Footballer (Originally from Ōtsu, Shiga, Japan)
- Priyanka Yoshikawa (吉川 プリアンカ) - Japanese beauty queen and pageant titleholder (Originally from Tokyo, Japan)
- Samir Rishu Mohanty (Rapper Big Deal) - Indian Rapper
- Kyoko Somekawa Jaishankar (染川京子) - Wife of India's Minister of External Affairs, S. Jaishankar

== See also ==
- India-Japan relations
- Indians in Japan
- Japanese language education in India
- Japan-India Association
