= Takehiro Shimada =

Japanese diplomat (born 1967)

- 島田 丈裕

Minister at the Embassy of Japan, Washington, D.C.
- Incumbent
- Assumed office July 2024

Chief of Protocol of Japan
- In office September 2022 – July 2024

Deputy Assistant Minister (Shingikan), Minister’s Secretariat

Personal details
- Born: 25 April 1967 (age 59) Tokyo, Japan
- Education: Keio University (LL.B.)
- Occupation: Diplomat

Takehiro Shimada (島田 丈裕, Shimada Takehiro; born April 25, 1967) is a Japanese diplomat.

After joining the Ministry of Foreign Affairs in 1991, he served in a number of senior positions, including Deputy Assistant Minister (Shingikan) in the Minister's Secretariat and Chief of Protocol. In July 2024, he was appointed Minister at the Embassy of Japan in the United States.

His father served as a medical officer at a Japanese consulate in Brazil.

== Early life and education ==
Shimada was born in Tokyo. He graduated from Toho Senior High School in Kunitachi city in March 1986 and from the Faculty of Law, Keio University in March 1991.

== Career ==
Shimada joined the Ministry of Foreign Affairs in April 1991. He was appointed First Secretary at the Embassy of Japan in the United States in August 2005, and became Counsellor there in January 2008. In August of the same year, he was transferred to the Embassy of Japan in India as Counsellor.

In July 2010, he became Director of the International Peace Cooperation Office, Security Policy Division, Foreign Policy Bureau. Following the 2011 Tōhoku earthquake and tsunami in March 2011, he concurrently served as Planning Officer attached to the Counsellor for Policy Coordination (Disaster Management) in the Cabinet Office, and to the Secretariat of the Special Headquarters for Assistance to Disaster Victims under the Emergency Disaster Response Headquarters. In April 2011, he returned to the Ministry of Foreign Affairs as Director of the International Peace Cooperation Office. In August 2011, he was appointed Coordinator for Foreign Policy in the General Affairs Division of the Foreign Policy Bureau.

In August 2012, Shimada became Director of the Cultural Affairs and Overseas Public Relations Division in the Minister's Secretariat. In November 2013, he was appointed Director of the China and Mongolia Division II of the Asian and Oceanian Affairs Bureau. In August 2015, he was seconded to the Cabinet Secretariat, where he served as Cabinet Councillor in the Office of the Assistant Chief Cabinet Secretary and as Director of the Policy Planning Office of the Secretariat of the Headquarters for the Abduction Issue.

In August 2017, he was appointed Minister at the Embassy of Japan in the United States. He returned to Tokyo in July 2020 as Councillor in the Minister's Secretariat, and in September 2021 became Deputy Assistant Minister for Overall Affairs and Director-General for Public Records Management. In September 2022, he was appointed Chief of Protocol with the ambassadorial rank. In July 2024, he was again appointed Minister at the Embassy of Japan in the United States.
