= India–Japan relations =

- India: Japan

Diplomatic mission
- Embassy of India, Tokyo: Embassy of Japan, New Delhi

Envoy
- Indian Ambassador to Japan Nagma Mallick: Japanese Ambassador to India Keiichi Ono

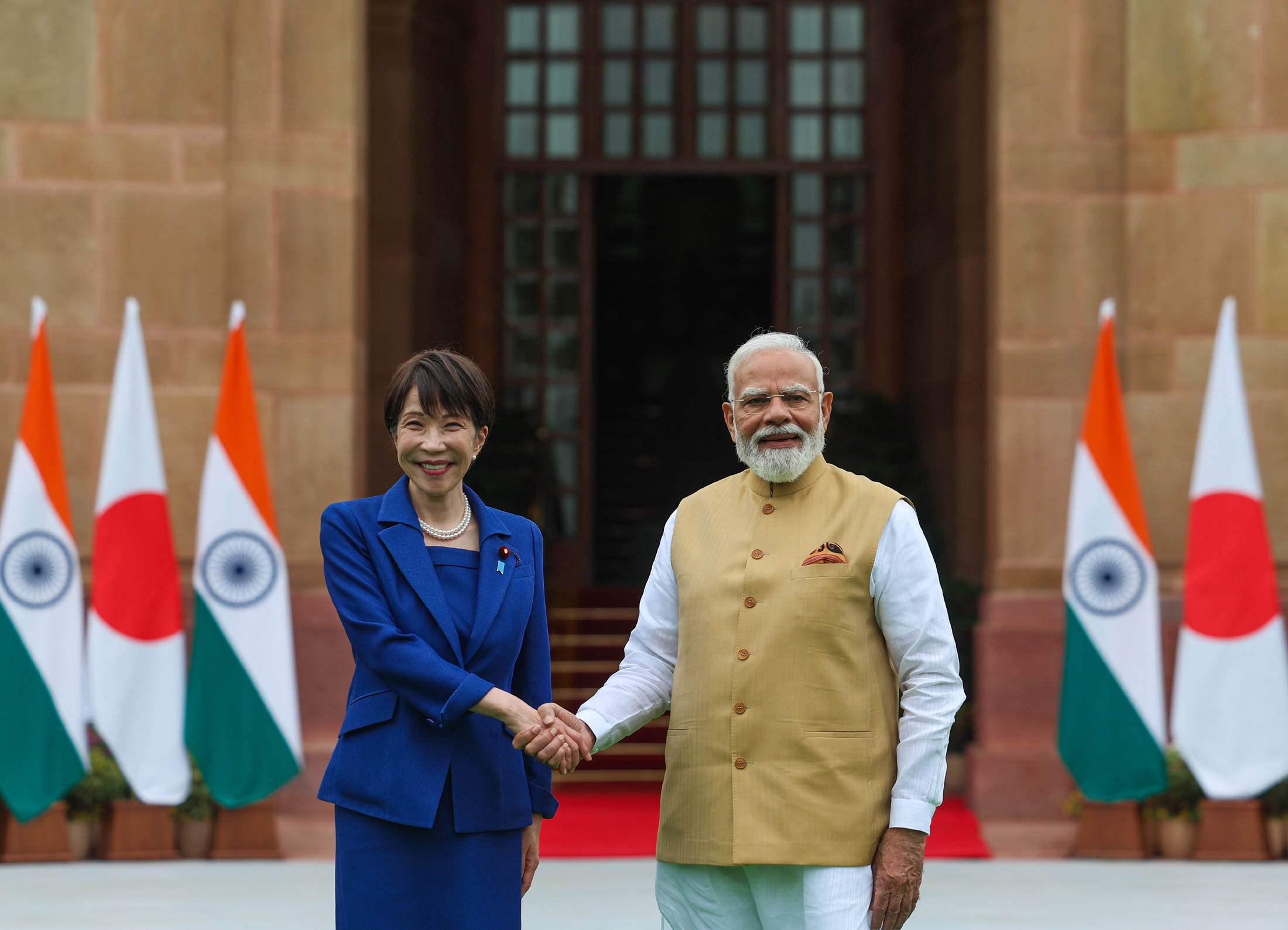
Prime Minister Narendra Modi of India and Prime Minister Sanae Takaichi of Japan during Prime Minister Takaichi's state visit to India, 2 July 2026

Relations between the Republic of India and State of Japan have traditionally been strong. The people of India and Japan have engaged in cultural exchanges since ancient times. They are guided by common cultural traditions, including the shared heritage of Buddhism, and share a strong commitment to the ideals of democracy, tolerance, pluralism, and open societies.

India and Japan have a high degree of congruence of political, economic, and strategic interests. They view each other as partners that have responsibility for and are capable of responding to global and regional challenges. India is the largest recipient of Japanese aid, and both countries have a special relationship of official development assistance (ODA). As of 2017, bilateral trade between India and Japan stood at US$17.63 billion.

During World War II, The United Kingdom, which ruled India, was attacked by Japan and fought back to final victory in 1945. The great majority of Indian soldiers fought under British command; some fought on behalf of Japan. Japanese forces committed various atrocities and war crimes on the Burmese Front and in the waters off South East India.

Political relations between the two nations have warmed since India's independence in 1947. Japanese companies, such as Yamaha, Sony, Toyota, and Honda have manufacturing facilities in India. With the growth of the Indian economy, India is a big market for Japanese firms. Japanese firms were some of the first to invest in India, the most prominent of which is Suzuki, which is in partnership with Indian automobiles company Maruti Suzuki, the largest car manufacturer in the Indian market, and a subsidiary of the Japanese company.

In December 2006, Indian prime minister Manmohan Singh's visit to Japan culminated in the signing of the "Joint Statement Towards Japan-India Strategic and Global Partnership". Japan has helped finance many infrastructure projects in India, most notably the Delhi Metro system. Indian applicants were welcomed in 2006 to the JET Programme, with one slot available in 2006 and increasing to 41 slots in 2007. In 2007, the Japanese Self-Defence Forces and the Indian Navy took part in a joint naval exercise Malabar 2007 in the Indian Ocean, which also involved the naval forces of Australia, Singapore and the United States. 2007 was declared "India-Japan Friendship Year."

According to a 2013 BBC World Service Poll, 42% of Japanese think India's international impact is mainly positive, with 4% considering it negative. In 2014, during Japanese PM Shinzo Abe's visit to India, both countries agreed to update their partnership to "Special Strategic and Global Partnership".

In July 2026, Prime Minister Sanae Takaichi paid a state visit to India. At a joint press conference, Takaichi stated that Japan and India should build on their complementary strengths to achieve greater shared prosperity, emphasising that closer bilateral cooperation had become increasingly important. Indian PM Narendra Modi stated that both the countries were closely aligned from "shared cultural values and to cutting-edge technology."

In August 2026, India proposed expanding basmati rice and processed food exports to Japan under the bilateral CEPA review.

== Historical relations ==
=== Hinduism in Japan ===
Hinduism and Shintoism incorporate animism within their core belief systems. Shintoism is theorised to have evolved from pre-historic shamanistic practices that were also found across North East Asia and may have been the most primitive intrinsic form of spiritual belief system held by humans throughout the world. Chinese dynastic histories mention the importance of designated shamans among early religious practices in Japan but not Korea. Shintoism is often thought of as having derived from the earliest animistic practices of the ancestors of Japan, the earliest type of belief system found across humanity, with strong influences from China and India in latter millennia, and "early shintoism" shares some similarities with other indigenous belief systems found in tribal communities.

In my opinion, if all our rich and educated men once go and see Japan, their eyes will be opened.

— Swami Vivekananda, The Complete Works of Swami Vivekananda/Volume 5/Conversations and Dialogues/VI – X Shri Priya Nath Sinha

Though Hinduism is a little-practiced religion in Japan, it has still had a significant, but indirect role in the formation of Japanese culture through Buddhism. Other examples of Hindu influence on Japan include the belief of "six schools" or "six doctrines" as well as use of Yoga and pagodas. Many of the facets of Hindu culture which have influenced Japan have also influenced Chinese culture. People have written books on the worship of Hindu gods in Japan.

=== Buddhism ===
Buddhism has been practised in Japan since its official introduction in 552 CE according to the Nihon Shoki from Baekje, Korea by Buddhist monks. Buddhism has had a major influence on the development of Japanese society and remains an influential aspect of the culture to this day. Japanese Buddhism is originally derived from the Chinese cannon, with influences from the Tibetan cannon and Pali cannon.

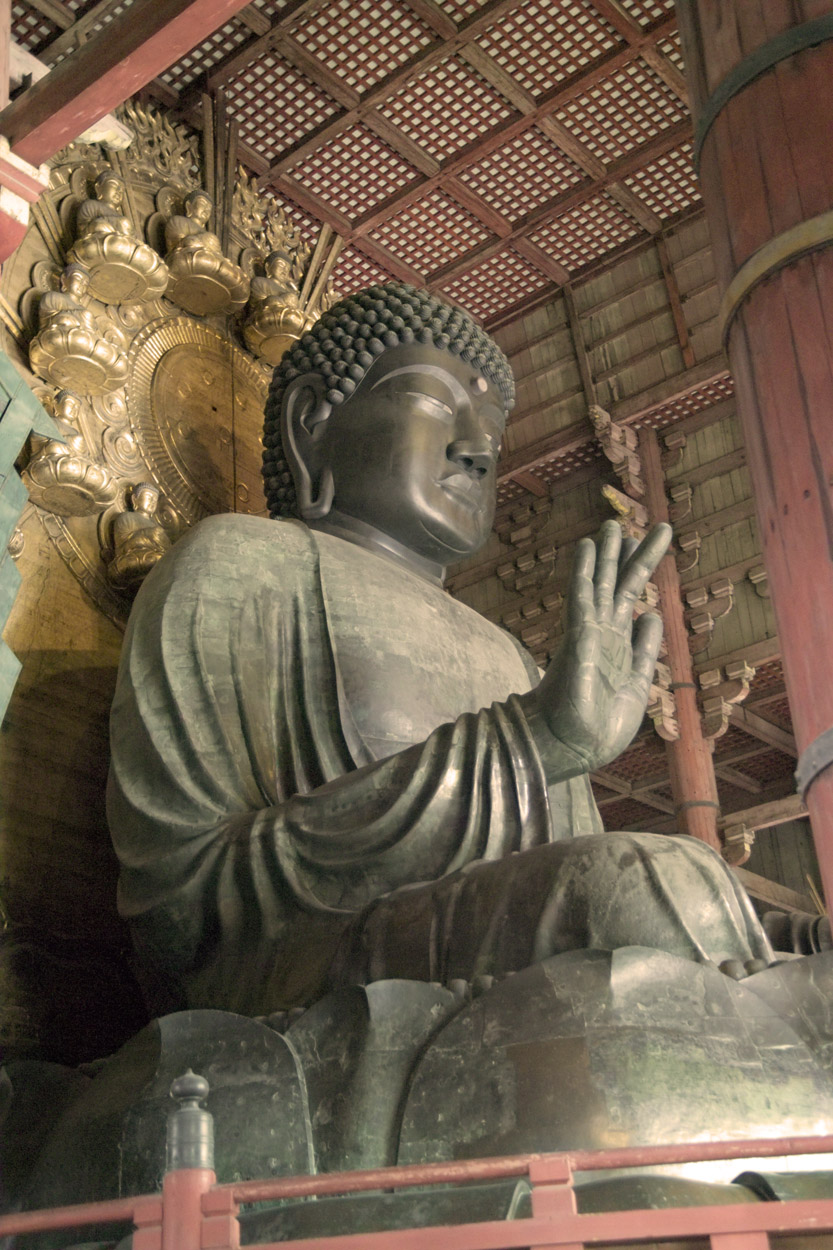
Great Buddha (Vairocana) Tōdai-ji temple, Japan

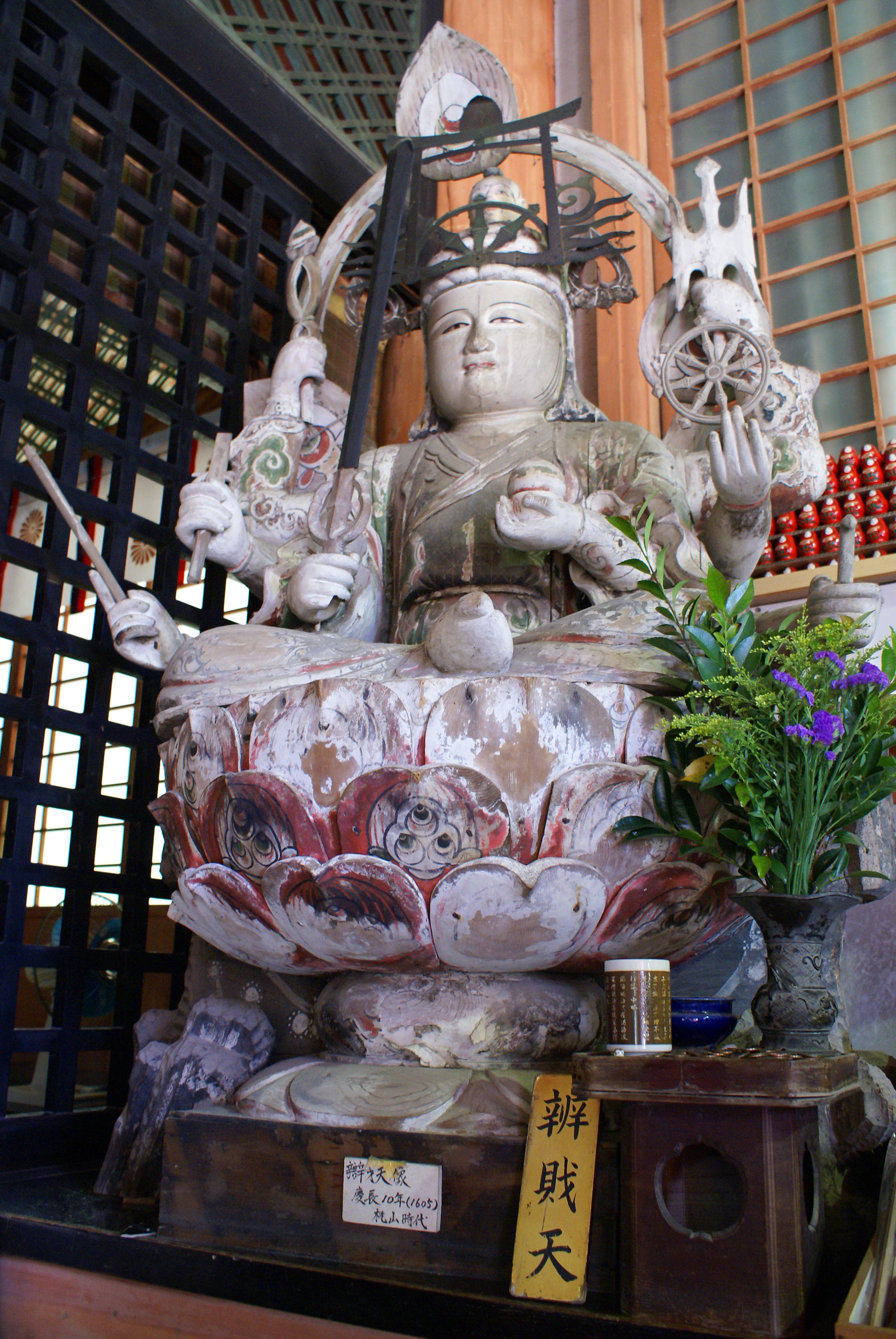
Benzaiten, one of the Seven Gods of Fortune in Japan, evolved from the Hindu deity Saraswati.

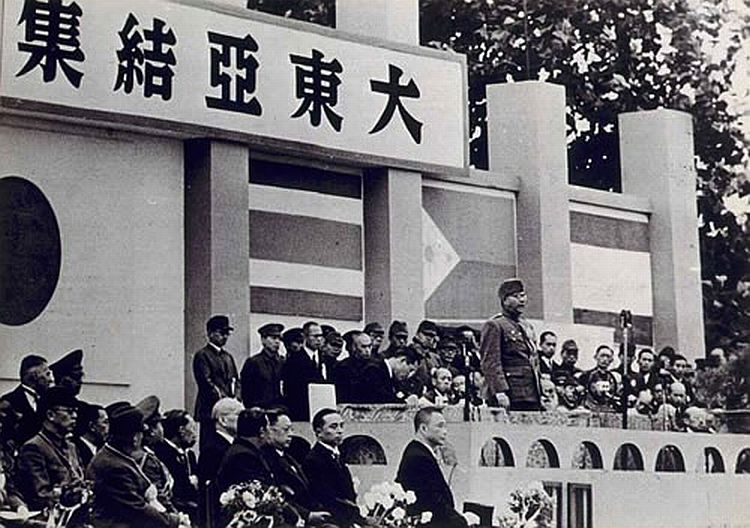
Subhas Chandra Bose addressing a rally in Tokyo, 1943

Cultural exchanges between India and Japan began early in the 6th century with the introduction of Buddhism to Japan from India. The Indian monk Bodhisena arrived in Japan in 736 to spread Buddhism and performed eye-opening of the Great Buddha built-in Tōdai-ji, and would remain in Japan until his death in 760. Buddhism and the intrinsically linked Indian culture had a great impact on Japanese culture, still felt today, and resulted in a natural sense of amiability between the two nations.

As a result of the link of Buddhism between India and Japan, monks and scholars often embarked on voyages between the two nations. Ancient records from the now-destroyed library at Nalanda University in India describe scholars and pupils who attended the school from Japan. One of the most famous Japanese travellers to the Indian subcontinent was Tenjiku Tokubei (1612–1692), whose nickname was derived from the Japanese name for India. Relations between the two nations have continued since then, but direct political exchange began only in the Meiji era (1868–1912), when Japan embarked on the process of modernisation.

=== Indian Independence Movement ===
In 1899 Tokyo Imperial University set up a chair in Sanskrit and Pali, with a further chair in Comparative religion being set up in 1903. In this environment, a number of Indian students came to Japan in the early twentieth century, founding the Oriental Youngmen's Association in 1900.

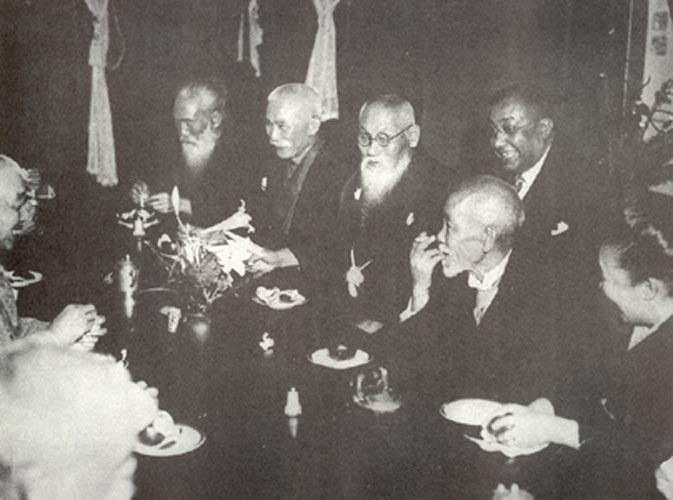
A dinner party given to Rash Behari Bose (the second from the right) in his honour by his close Japanese friends, Mitsuru Tōyama, a Pan-Asianism leader (center, behind the table), and Tsuyoshi Inukai, future Japanese prime minister (to the right of Tōyama). 1915.

The Flag India and Japan.

Sureshchandra Bandopadhyay, Manmatha Nath Ghosh and Hariprobha Takeda were among the earliest Indians who visited Japan and wrote on their experiences there. As India was then a British colony, Indo-Japanese relations were boosted by the Anglo-Japanese Alliance. However, other emerging movements would strengthen relations between the two nations. Pan-Asian ideals and the Indian independence movement saw India and Japan grow closer, reaching their apogee during the Second World War. Relations between Britain and Japan had started to deteriorate since the end of the Anglo-Japanese Alliance on 17 August 1923 due to American pressure. Many Indian independence activists escaped to Japan, including activist Rash Behari Bose which furthered Indo-Japanese relations.

Japan started the Pacific phase of the Second World War by attacking British, Dutch, and American possessions in Asia. The Japanese eventually aimed to capture the British colony of Burma, establishing an alliance with the Indian National Army, an Indian nationalist organisation which adopted the "an enemy of our enemy is our friend" attitude, a legacy that is still controversial today given the war crimes committed by Imperial Japan and its allies.

=== During World War II ===
Since India was a British colony when the Second World War broke out, it was deemed to have entered the war on the side of the Allies. Over 2 million Indians participated in the war; many served in combat against the Japanese who briefly occupied British Burma and reached the Indian border. Some 67,000 Indian soldiers were captured by the Japanese when Singapore surrendered in 1942, many of whom later became part of the Japanese-sponsored Indian National Army (INA). In 1944–45, combined British and Indian forces defeated the Japanese in a series of battles in Burma and the INA disintegrated.

==== Indian National Army ====
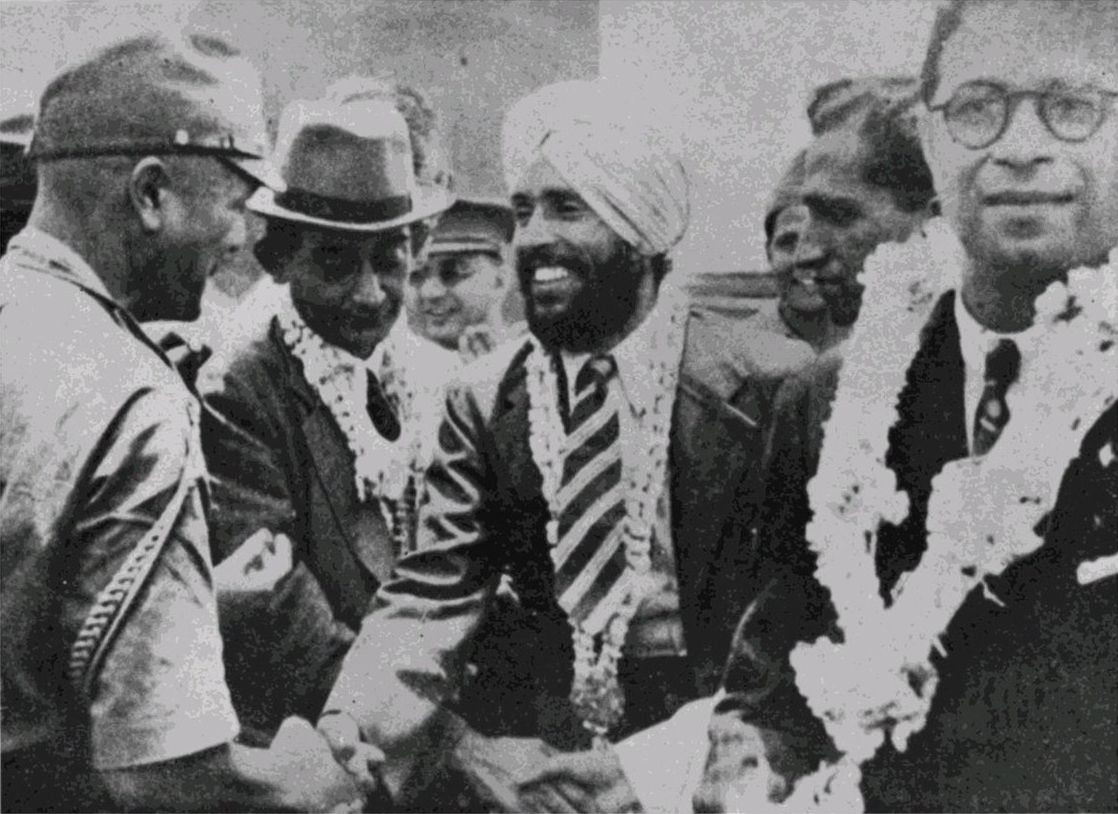
Major Iwaichi Fujiwara of Japan greets Captain Mohan Singh of the First Indian National Army, April 1942.

Subhas Chandra Bose, who led the Azad Hind, a nationalist movement which aimed to end British rule in India through military means, used Japanese sponsorship to form the Azad Hind Fauj or Indian National Army (INA). The INA was composed mainly of former prisoners of war from the Indian Army who had been captured by the Japanese after the fall of Singapore. Japanese forces included INA units in many battles, most notably at the U Go Offensive at Manipur. The offensive culminated in the Battles of Imphal and Kohima where the Japanese forces were pushed back and the INA lost cohesion.

== Modern relations ==
At the International Military Tribunal for the Far East, Indian Justice Radhabinod Pal became famous for delivering a dissenting judgment in favour of Japan. This judgment of Radhabinod Pal is echoed even today by many right-wing groups in Japan, who use it to portray Japan as victim, thereby downplaying Japan's own war crimes. This became a symbol of the close ties between India and Japan.

On 15 August 1947, Japan was among the first nations to recognise Indian sovereignty after its independence from the United Kingdom. A relatively well-known result of the two nations' was in 1949, when India sent the Tokyo Zoo two elephants to cheer the spirits of the defeated Japanese empire.

India refused to attend the San Francisco Peace Conference in 1951 due to its concerns over limitations imposed upon Japanese sovereignty and national independence. After the restoration of Japan's sovereignty, Japan and India signed a peace treaty, establishing official diplomatic relations on 28 April 1952, in which India waived all reparation claims against Japan. This treaty was one of the first treaties Japan signed after World War II. Diplomatic, trade, economic, and technical relations between India and Japan were well established. India's iron ore helped Japan's recovery from World War II devastation, and following Japanese prime minister Nobusuke Kishi's visit to India in 1957, Japan started providing yen loans to India in 1958, as the first yen loan aid extended by the Japanese government.

In India, there was great admiration for Japan's post-war economic reconstruction and subsequent rapid growth. Relations between the two nations were constrained, however, by Cold War politics. Japan, as a result of World War II reconstruction, was a U.S. ally, whereas India pursued a non-aligned foreign policy, often leaning towards the Soviet Union. Since the 1980s, however, efforts were made to strengthen bilateral ties. India's ‘Look East’ policy posited Japan as a key partner. Since 1986, Japan has become India's largest aid donor, and remains so.

=== Post-Cold War ===
Relations between the two nations reached a brief low in 1998 as a result of Pokhran-II, an Indian nuclear weapons test that year. Japan imposed sanctions on India following the test, which included the suspension of all political exchanges and the cutting of economic assistance. These sanctions were lifted three years later. Relations improved exponentially following this period, as bilateral ties between the two nations improved once again, to the point where the Japanese prime minister, Shinzo Abe was to be the chief guest at India's 2014 Republic Day parade. In 2014, the Indian PM Narendra Modi visited Japan. During his tenure as the Chief Minister of Gujarat, Modi had maintained good ties with the Japanese PM Shinzo Abe. His 2014 visit further strengthened the ties between the two countries, and resulted in several key agreements, including the establishment of a "Special Strategic Global Partnership".

Modi visited Japan for the second time as prime minister in November 2016. During the meeting, India and Japan signed the "Agreement for Cooperation in Peaceful Uses of Nuclear Energy", a landmark civil nuclear agreement, under which Japan supplied nuclear reactors, fuel, and technology to India. India is not a signatory to the non-Proliferation Treaty (NPT) and is the only non-signatory to receive an exemption from Japan. The two sides also signed agreements on manufacturing skill development in India, cooperation in space, earth sciences, agriculture, forestry and fisheries, transport and urban development.

Yogendra Puranik, popularly known as Yogi, became the first elected India-born City Councillor in Japan, to represent the City Council of Edogawa City in Tokyo. His victory was well received by the mass public and media, not just in India and Japan but across the globe including China.

== Economic relations ==
In August 2000, the Japanese prime minister visited India. At this meeting, Japan and India agreed to establish a "Japan-India Global Partnership in the 21st Century." Indian prime minister Vajpayee visited Japan in December 2001, where both prime ministers issued the "Japan-India Joint Declaration." In April 2005, Japanese prime minister Koizumi visited India and signed Joint Statement "Japan-India Partnership in the New Asian Era: Strategic Orientation of Japan-India Global Partnership."

Japan is the 3rd largest investor in the Indian economy with cumulative FDI inflows of $30.27 billion from 2000 to 2019, contributing 7.2% to India's total FDI inflows during the same period. The imports to India from Japan stood at $12.77 billion from 2018 to 2019, making it India's 14th largest import partner.

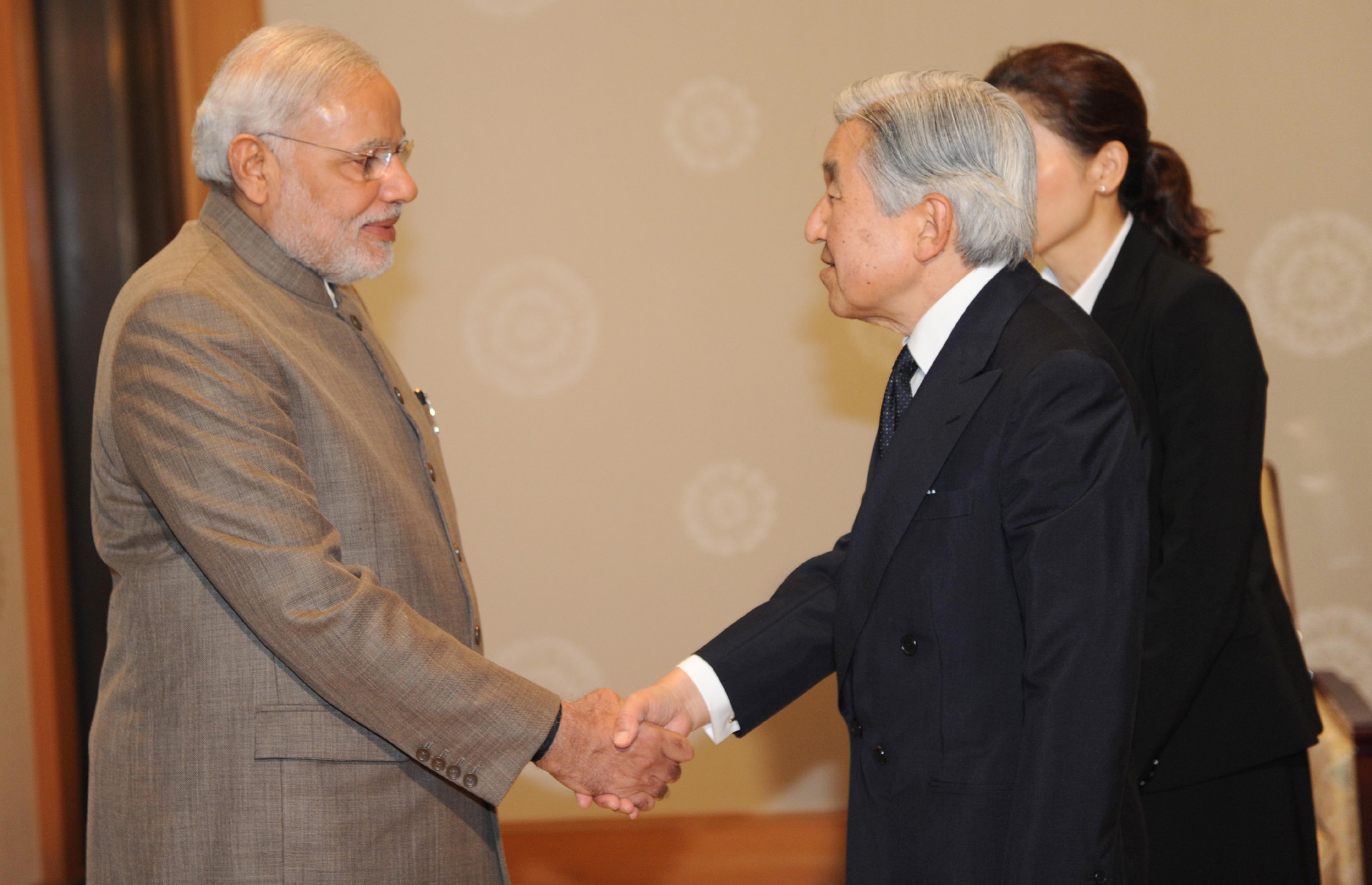
The Emperor of Japan, His Majesty Akihito with the prime minister, Shri Narendra Modi, in Tokyo, Japan in 2014

In October 2008, Japan signed an agreement with India under which it would provide the latter a low-interest loan worth US$4.5 billion to construct a railway project between Delhi and Mumbai. This is the single largest overseas project being financed by Japan and reflected a growing economic partnership between the two nations. India is also one of the only three countries in the world with whom Japan has a security pact. As of 2022, Japan has been the third-largest investor in India over the previous two decades.

Kenichi Yoshida, a director of Softbridge Solutions Japan, stated in late 2009 that Indian engineers were becoming the backbone of Japan's IT industry and that "it is important for Japanese industry to work together with India". Under the memorandum, any Japanese coming to India for business or work will be straightway granted a three-year visa and similar procedures will be followed by Japan. Other highlights of this visit include the abolition of customs duties on 94 per cent of trade between the two nations over the next decade. As per the Agreement, tariffs will be removed on almost 90 per cent of Japan's exports to India and 97 per cent of India's exports to Japan Trade between the two nations has also steadily been growing.

India and Japan signed an agreement in December 2015 to build a bullet train line between Mumbai and Ahmedabad using Japan's Shinkansen technology, with a loan from Japan of £12bn. More than four-fifths of the project's $19bn (£14.4bn) cost will be funded by a 0.1% interest-rate loan from Japan as part of a deepening economic relationship.

In January 2021, India and Japan signed a memorandum of understanding covering information and communications technology with a focus on 5G.

On 19 March 2022, during a meeting with Prime Minister Narendra Modi in New Delhi, Japanese prime minister Fumio Kishida pledged a 5 trillion yen ($42 billion) investment in India over the next five years.

In July 2023, the countries signed a new memorandum of understanding to develop the semiconductor industry.

In 2025, Japan pledged to more than double its investment in India to about $61 billion over the next decade.

By 2026, bilateral trade between the two countries reached $27.5 billion, while the Japanese investment in India stood at $3.2 billion between April and December 2025.

== Military relations ==
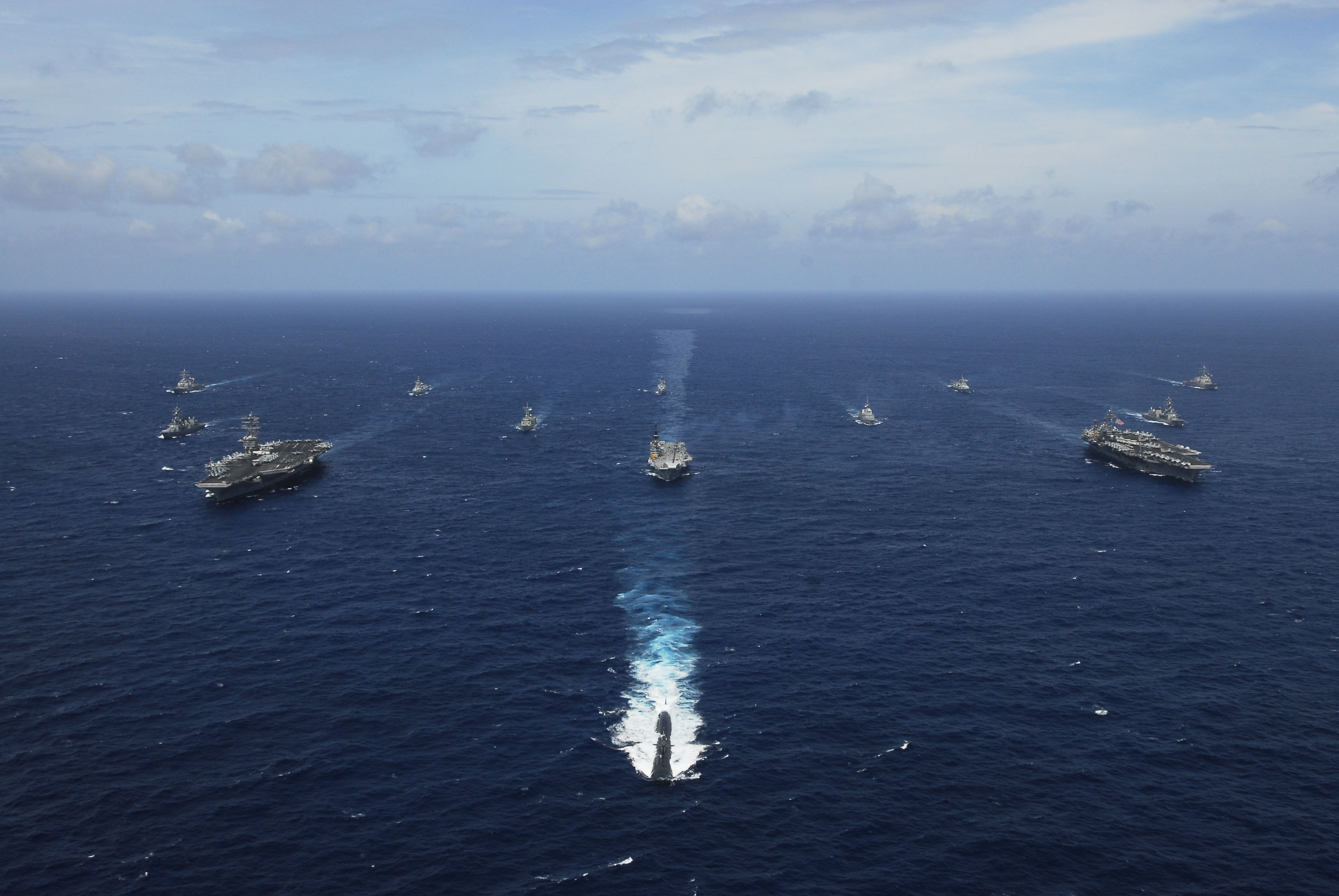
Japan Maritime Self-Defence Force and Indian Navy warships took part in the Malabar 2007 naval exercises off India's western coast, one of the many such multilateral exercises Japan has taken part in symbolising close military co-operation between India and Japan.

India and Japan also have close military ties. They have shared interests in maintaining the security of sea-lanes in the Asia-Pacific and Indian Ocean, and in co-operation for fighting international crime, terrorism, piracy and proliferation of weapons of mass destruction. The two nations have frequently held joint military exercises and co-operate on technology. India and Japan concluded a security pact on 22 October 2008.

Former Japanese prime minister Shinzo Abe is seen by some to have been an "Indophile" and, with rising tensions in territorial disputes with Japan's neighbours, advocated closer security cooperation with India.

In July 2014, the Indian Navy participated in Exercise Malabar with the Japanese and US navies, reflecting shared perspectives on Indo-Pacific maritime security. India is also negotiating to purchase US-2 amphibious aircraft for the Indian Navy.

In July 2026, India and Japan elevated their strategic partnership into a defence-industrial integration framework and signed their first major defence co-development and co-production program. A memorandum of implementation was signed for the fitment of advanced Unified Complex Radio Antenna (UNICORN) integrated mast system onboard Indian Navy's surface combatant vessels.

=== 2016 nuclear deal ===
In November 2016, Indian prime minister Narendra Modi on a three-day visit to Japan signed a deal with his counterpart Shinzo Abe on nuclear energy. The deal took six years to negotiate, delayed in part by the 2011 Fukushima nuclear disaster. This is the first time that Japan signed such deal with a non-signatory of Non-Proliferation Treaty. The deal gives Japan the right to supply nuclear reactors, fuel and technology to India. This deal aimed to help India build the six nuclear reactors in southern India, increasing nuclear energy capacity ten-fold by 2032.

=== Indo-Pacific ===
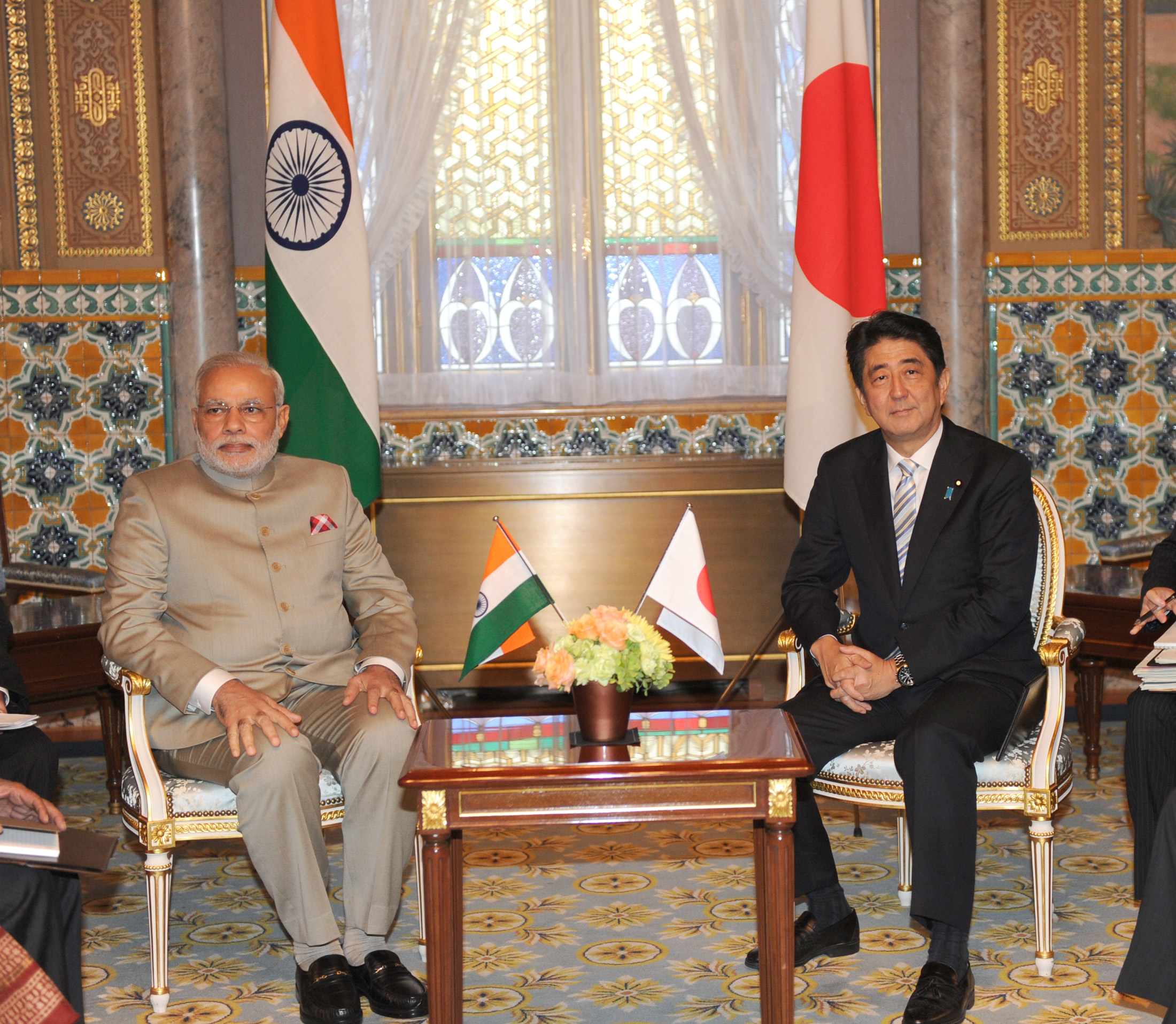
Prime Minister Narendra Modi of India and Prime Minister Shinzō Abe of Japan, during the former's bilateral visit to Japan, 2014

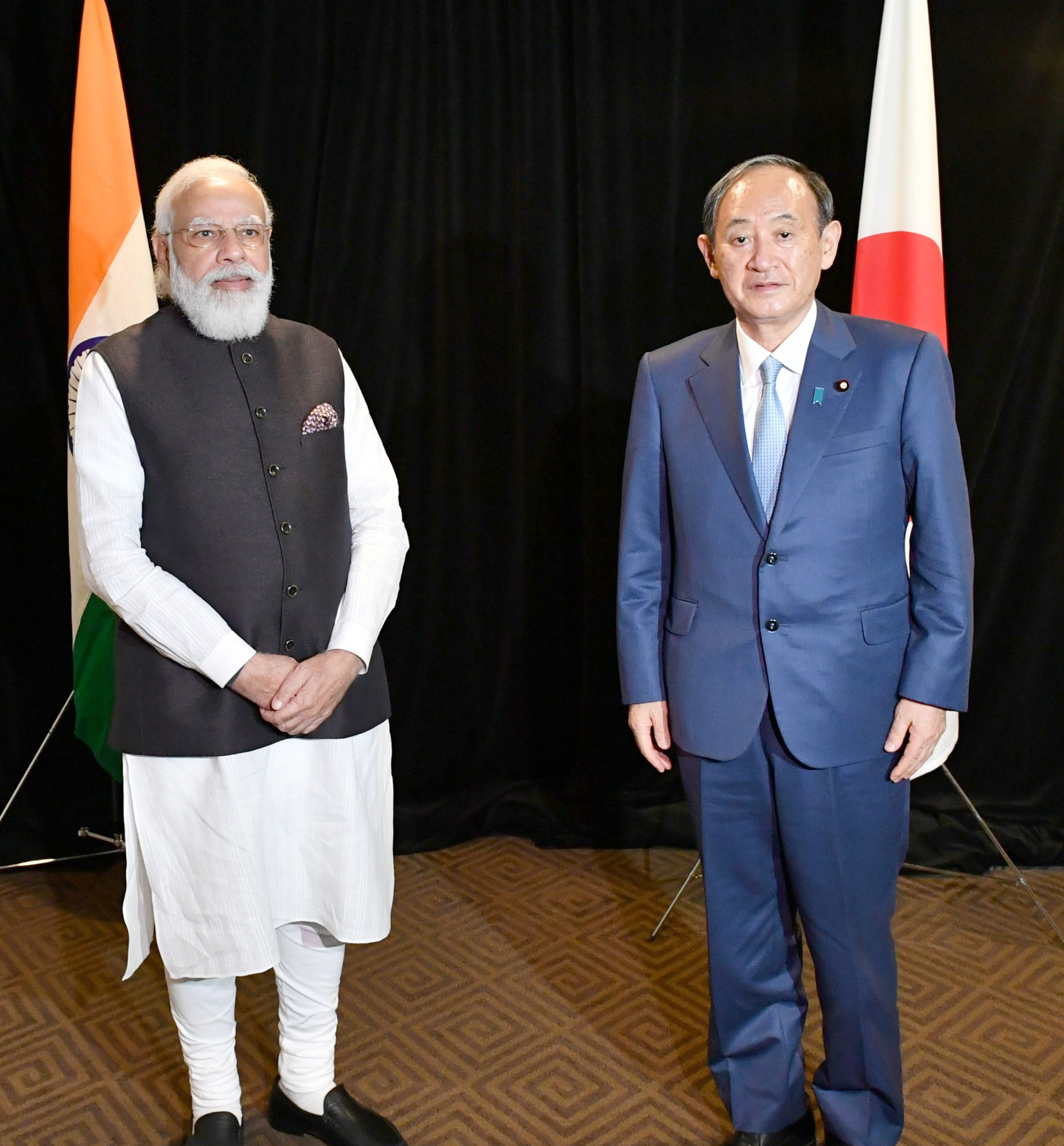
Prime Minister Narendra Modi in a Bilateral Meeting with the prime minister of Japan, Yoshihide Suga, in Washington, D.C., USA on 22 September 2021

Both India and Japan are committed to a "Free and Open Indo-Pacific", and India has strategically cooperated with Japan through the Act East policy. The strategic partnership between India and Japan is seen as a cornerstone of peace and stability in the Indo-Pacific region.

In August 2017, the two countries announced the establishment of the Japan-India Coordination Forum (JICF) for Development of the North-Eastern Region, described by India as "a coordination forum to identify priority development areas of cooperation for development" of northeast India. The forum will focus on strategic projects aimed at improving connectivity, roads, electric infrastructure, food processing, disaster management, and promoting organic farming and tourism in northeast India. A Japanese embassy spokesperson stated that the development of the northeast was a "priority" for India and its Act East Policy and that Japan placed a "special emphasis on cooperation in North East for its geographical importance connecting India to South-East Asia and historical ties". The forum held its first meeting on 3 August 2017.

In May 2023, Japanese prime minister Fumio Kishida announced a new Indo-Pacific plan during his visit to India.

In May 2026, Japanese prime minister Sanae Takaichi announced an updated Free and Open Indo-Pacific (FOIP) initiative. On 2 July 2026, during her state-visit to India, Takaichi stated that a "free, prosperous, and rules-based Indo-Pacific" remains a shared priority for both countries. She also said that Prime Minister Narendra Modi’s MAHASAGAR initiative was closely aligned with the FOIP policy.

== Cultural relations ==
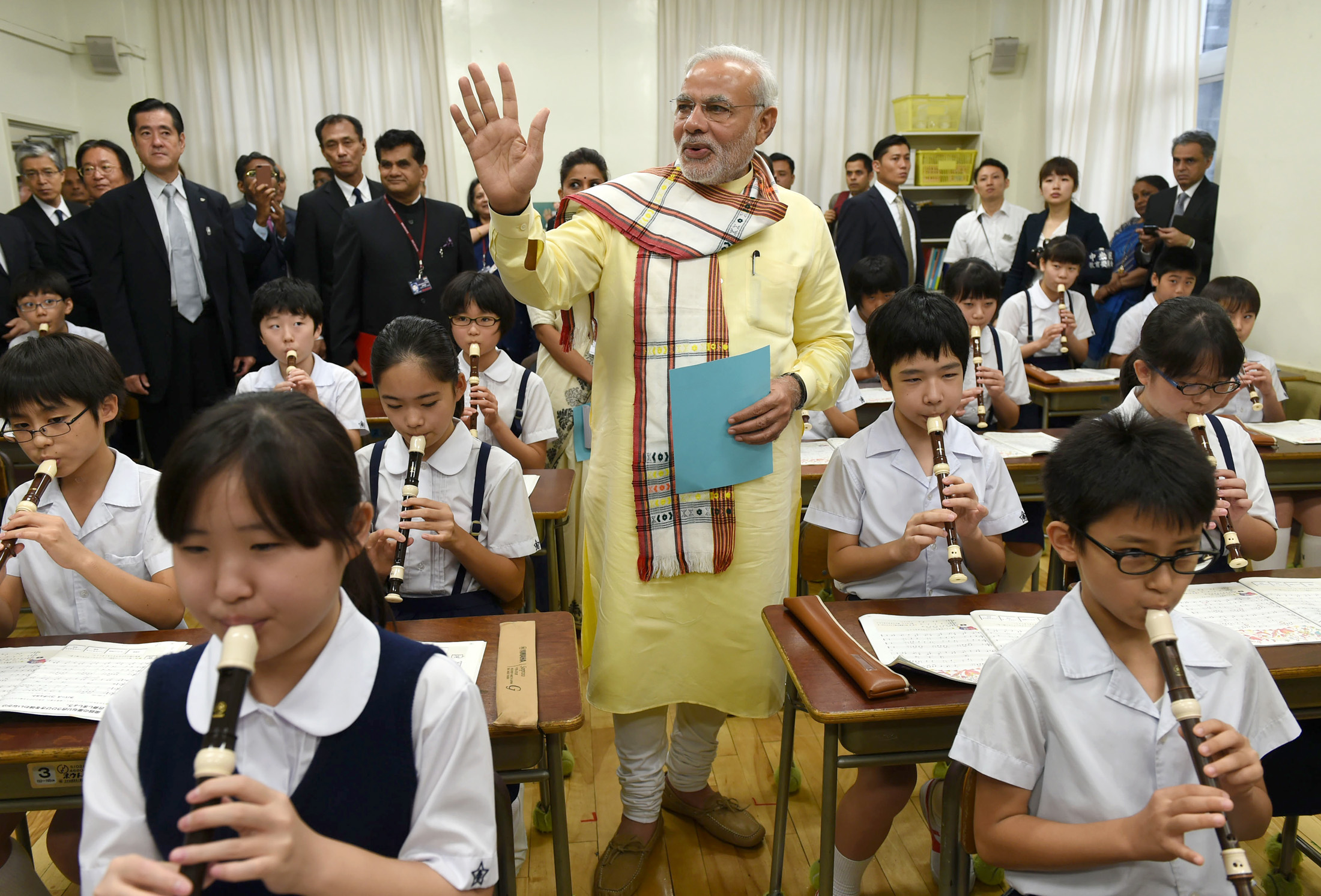
Indian PM Narendra Modi in a music class at the Taimei Elementary School, Tokyo

Japan and India have strong cultural ties, based mainly on Japanese Buddhism, which remains widely practised through Japan even today. The Japan–India Association was founded in 1903. The two nations announced 2007, the 50th anniversary year of the Indo-Japan Cultural Agreement, as the Indo-Japan Friendship and Tourism-Promotion Year, holding cultural events in both the countries. One such cultural event is the annual Namaste India Festival, which started in Japan over twenty years ago and is now the largest festival of its kind in the world. At the 2016 festival, representatives from Onagawa town performed, as a sign of appreciation for the support the town received from the Indian Government during the Great East Japan Earthquake. The Indian National Disaster Response Force (NDRF) team had been dispatched in Onagawa for its first overseas mission and conducted search and rescue operations for missing people. Little World Museum of Man, an open-air museum and amusement park near Inuyama, Japan features a Tharavad, a traditional Indian house from the state of Kerala.

Starting 3 July 2014, Japan has been issuing multiple entry visas for the short term stay of Indian nationals.

=== Religious influence ===
Centuries of cultural exchanges between the two countries created many parallels in their folklore. Modern popular culture based upon this folklore, such as works of fantasy fiction in manga and anime, sometimes bear references to common deities (deva), demons (asura) and philosophical concepts. The Indian goddess Saraswati for example, is known as Benzaiten in Japan. Brahma, known as 'Bonten', and Yama, known as 'Enma', are also part of the traditional Japanese Buddhist pantheon. In addition to the common Buddhist influence on the two societies, Shintoism, being an animist religion, is similar to the animist strands of Hinduism, in contrast to the religions present in the rest of the world, which are monotheistic. Sanskrit, a classical language used in Buddhism and Hinduism, is still used by some ancient Chinese priests who immigrated to Japan, and the Siddhaṃ script is still written to this day, despite having passed out of usage in India. It is also thought that the distinctive torii gateways at temples in Japan, may be related to the torana gateways used in Indian temples.

=== Cinema and media ===
An increase in cultural exchange occurred during the mid-late 20th century through Asian cinema, with Indian cinema and Japanese cinema both experiencing a "golden age" during the 1950s and 1960s. Indian films by Satyajit Ray, Guru Dutt were influential in Japan, while Japanese films by Akira Kurosawa, Yasujirō Ozu and Takashi Shimizu have likewise been influential in India.

Osamu Tezuka wrote a biographical manga Buddha from 1972 to 1983. On 10 April 2006, a Japanese delegation proposed to raise funds and provide other support for rebuilding the world-famous ancient Nalanda University, an ancient Buddhist centre of learning in Bihar, into a major international institution of education.

India and Japan also have a strong relationship through Japanese media. One of the first Indian animated films, Ramayana: The Legend of Prince Rama, was co-produced and animated by Japan. Many Japanese anime TV shows are dubbed into Hindi, Tamil and Telugu and aired in India. In February 2005, Doraemon became the first anime to be introduced in India, which currently airs on Disney Channel. More than thirty Doraemon feature films have been dubbed and telecasted, making it the most number of movies from a particular anime series to be aired in India. Other popular anime in India include the Pokémon series, Crayon Shin-Chan, Dragon Ball Z, and Ninja Hattori-kun. Anime films are also distributed in Indian theatres.

Bollywood has become more popular among the Japanese people in recent decades, and the Indian yogi and pacifist Dhalsim is one of the most popular characters in the Japanese video game series Street Fighter.

== Resident diplomatic missions ==
- India has an embassy in Tokyo and consulates-general in Fukuoka and Osaka.
- Japan has an embassy in New Delhi and consulates-general in Bengaluru, Chennai, Kolkata and Mumbai.
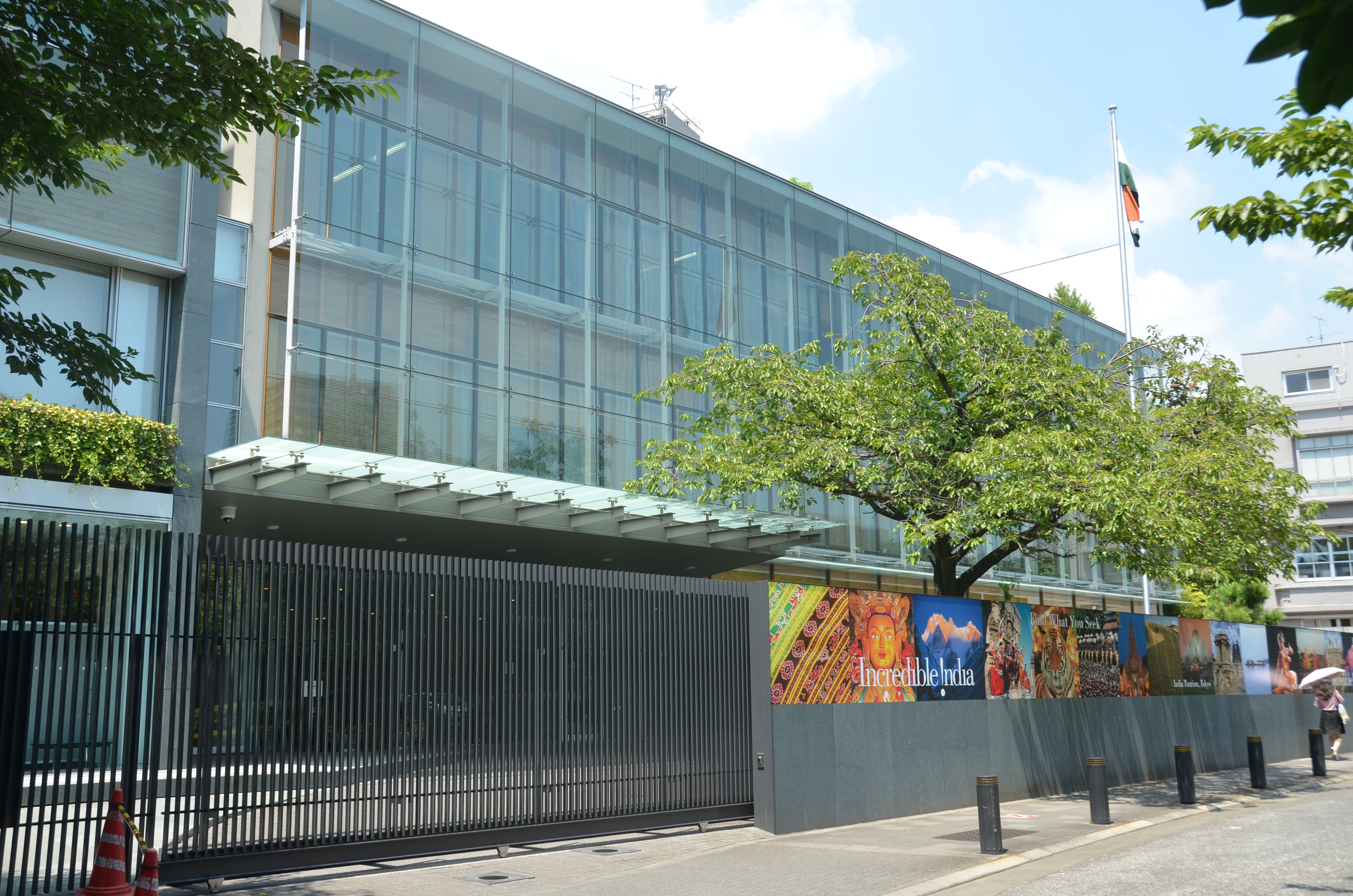
Embassy of India in Tokyo

== See also ==
- Foreign relations of India
- Foreign relations of Japan
- Buddhism in Japan
- Hinduism in Japan
- Indians in Japan
- Japanese people in India
- Japanese language education in India
- Japanese curry
- Manga outside Japan § India
- Quadrilateral Security Dialogue
- Yamuna Action Plan (YAP)
- Asia-Africa Growth Corridor
- Video games in India
