= Japan Habba =

Cultural exchange program between India and Japan

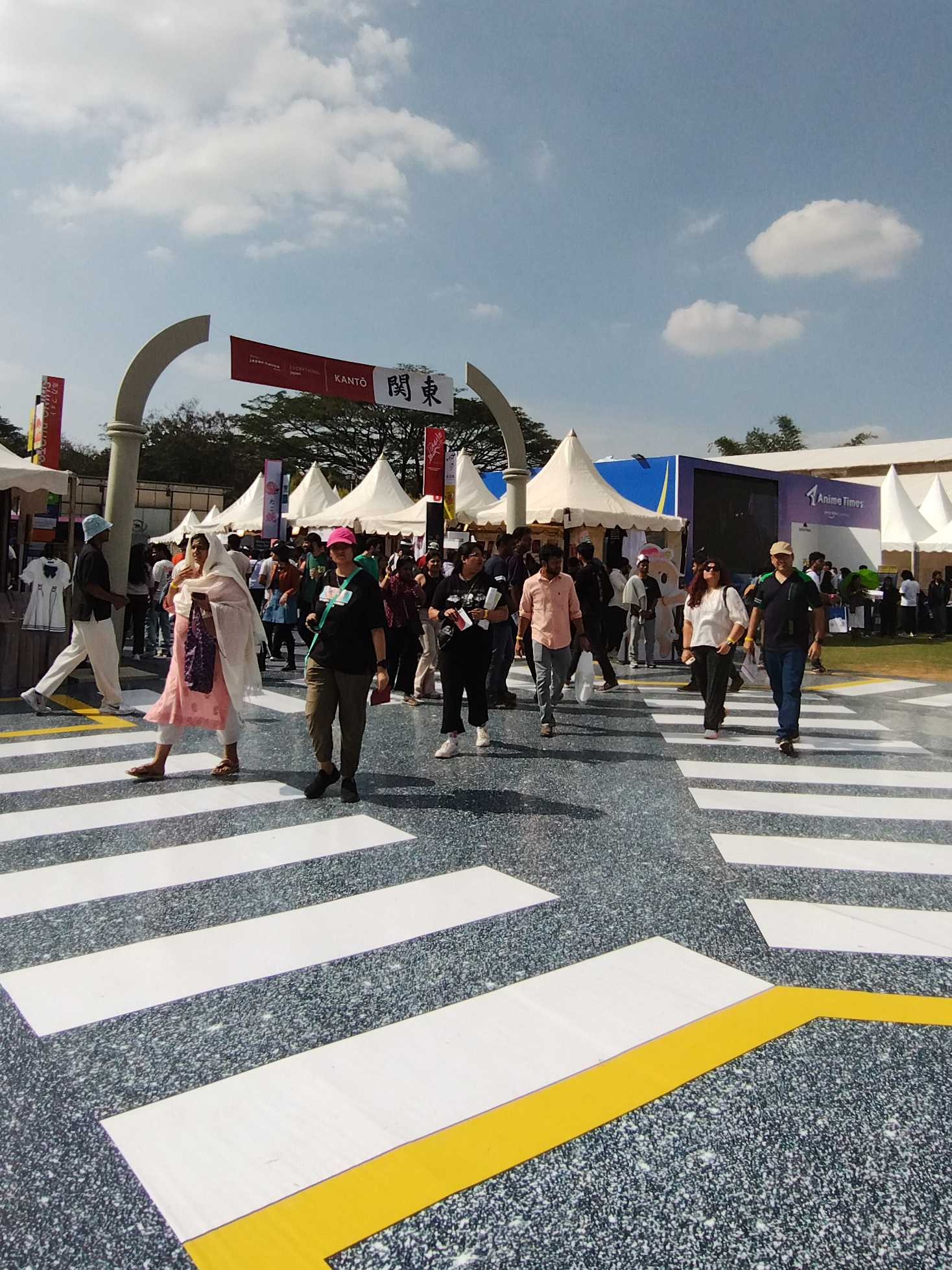
Replica of Shibuya Crossing, and gateway to the expo area named after Kanto region, in Japan Habba 2025

Japan Habba (Japan Festival) (Kannada: ಜಪಾನ್ ಹಬ್ಬ, Japanese: ジャパン ハッバ) is a cultural exchange program between Indian and Japanese people. Started in 2005, it is an annual event that aims at showcasing Japanese culture, to students of the Japanese language and those interested in Japan and its culture, under one platform. It has been celebrated in Bangalore during spring (January–February) of every year.

The word, "Japan Habba" was coined from two words, 'Japan' and 'Habba', where Habba refers to "Festival" in Kannada.

== Purpose ==
The sole purpose of Japan Habba is to facilitate, strengthen, and deepen the ties between the people of India and Japan, which is the foundation for relationships.

== History ==
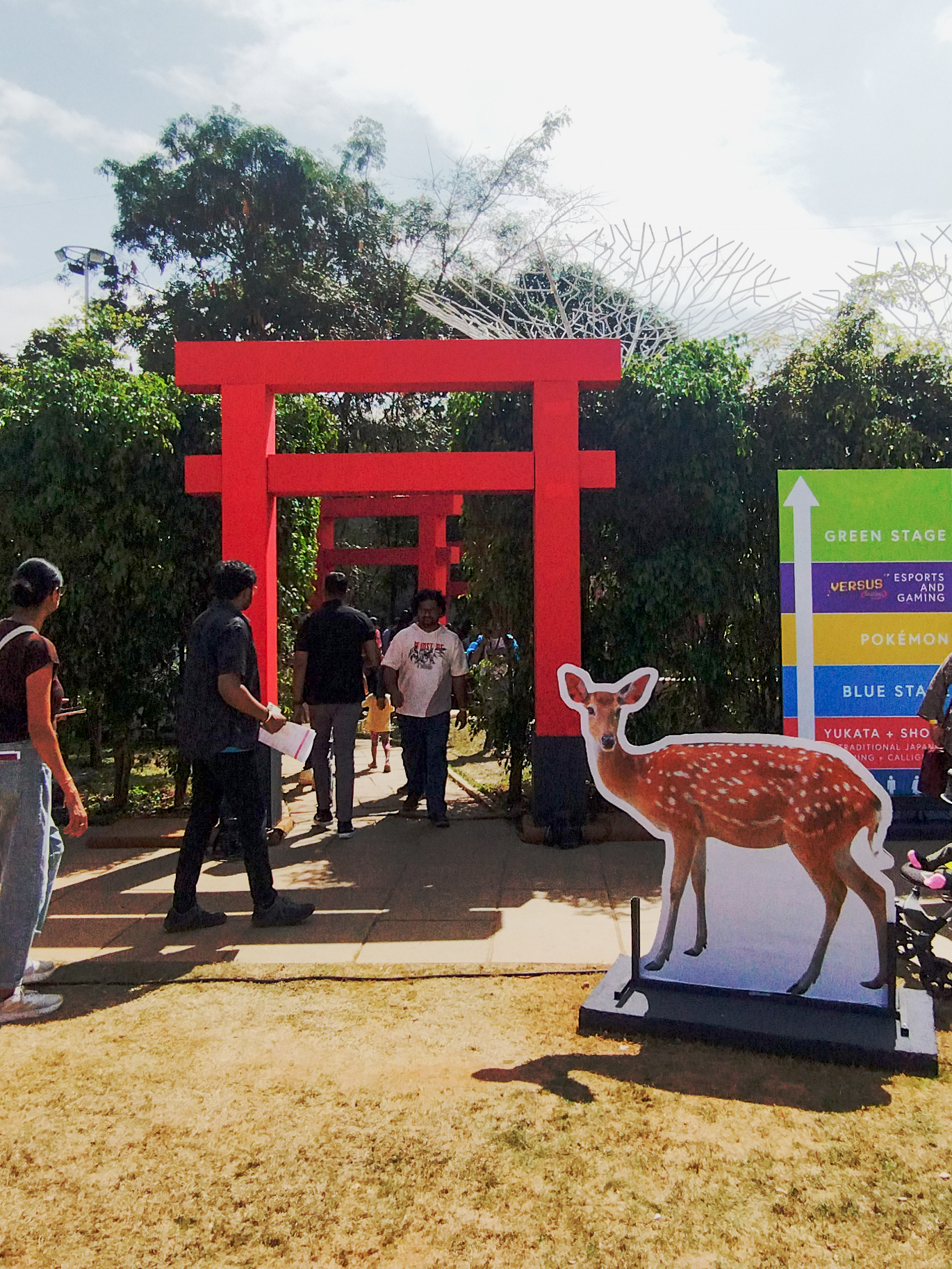
Torii gates and cutout depicting a deer from Nara Park, in Japan Habba 2025

Japan Habba started as a cultural event of the Indo-Japan Cultural Exchange Programme under the Department of Foreign Languages at Bangalore University in 2005. Satoshi Hata, who was a guest faculty for the Japanese language, started it as an effort to promote Japanese learners, by providing them a platform to showcase their interest. Hata served as the Chairman of Japan Habba Organizing Committee (JHOC), and after he left India, the members of the department continued to host the event. It is now organized by the Japan Habba Trust.

The first Japan Habba was held in 2005 at Jnana Jyothi Auditorium in Central College Campus, Bangalore University, and had 300 attendees. The event has been organized every year, but after 2009 there was a gap of two years and it resumed in 2011. As the event grew, it was shifted to other locations– it was held at JN Tata Auditorium in National Science Seminar Complex, Indian Institute of Science from 2018 to 2024, with the exception of 2021 when it was virtual due to the COVID-19 pandemic. In 2018, when the event moved to IISc, the expo component and Tech Fair were added; in 2021, anime-manga and cosplay were included; and in 2023, gaming events were introduced.

The 20th edition of the event was held in 2025 at Chamara Vajra, and reportedly had a footfall of 15000 people. The expo was divided into segments based on the regions of Japan, featuring decor corresponding to that region; like the Shibuya Crossing in Kanto, and Nara Park in Kansai. Each attendee also got a Japan Habba passport on which they could collect stamps at each region and for each activity. In this edition, esports tournaments were also held as a part of “The Versus Festival: Habba Edition”.

== Program overview ==
There are various programs that are part of Japan Habba:

- Karaoke contest
- Group Dance
- Group Song performance
- Comparison of Indian and Japanese culture through a small play

Apart from celebration programs, a lot of booths are open in Japan Habba:

- Japanese summer clothes (Yukata)
- Japanese tea ceremony (Ochakai)
- Japanese Calligraphy exhibition
- Live calligraphy experience
- Japanese paper folding exhibition (Origami)
- Kanji / Chinese character mehndi
- Japanese sweet candy
- Disposable chopsticks popper

== Active organizations ==
Japan Habba is celebrated under the auspices of below organizations.

1. Japan Habba Trust
2. Consulate of Japan in Bangalore
3. The Japan Foundation, New Delhi
4. Bangalore Nihongo Kyoshi-kai (Japanese Teachers' Association, Bangalore)
5. Koyo Japanese-speaking Group
6. Indo-Japanese Chamber of Commerce and Industries

== See also ==
- Japanese people in India
