= Rubber tapping =

Process by which latex is collected from a rubber tree

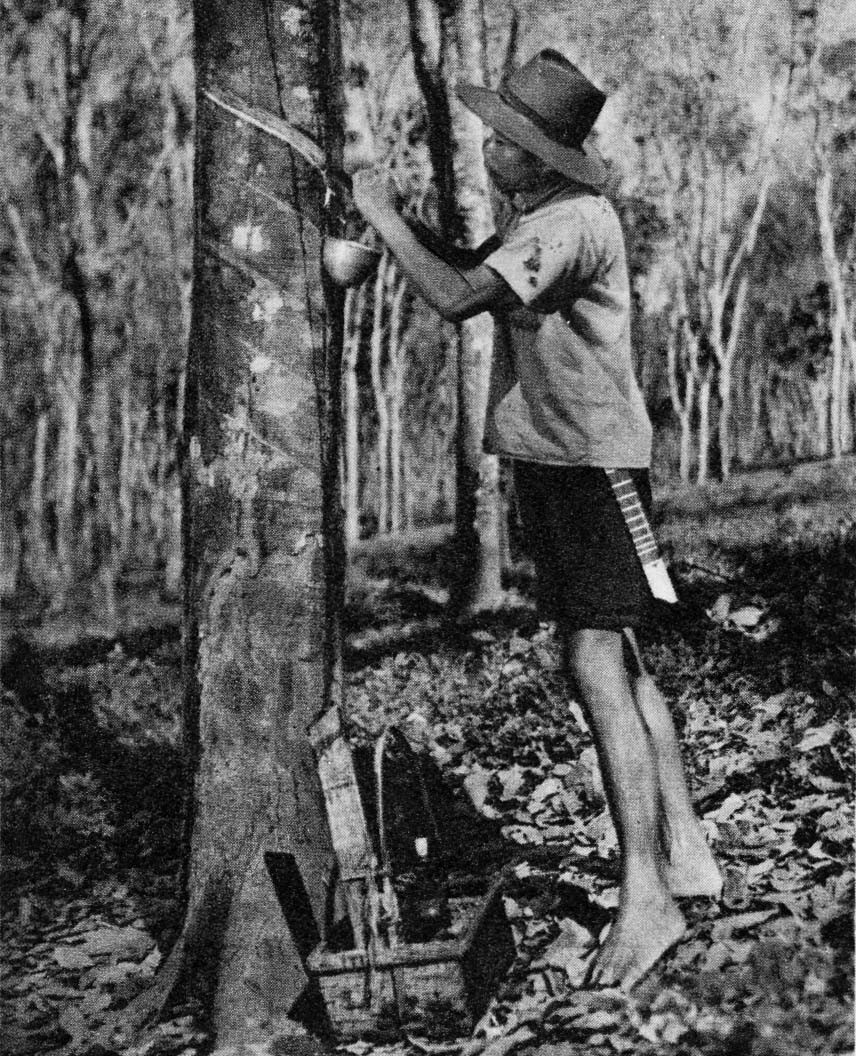
Rubber tapping in Indonesia, 1951

Rubber tapping is the process by which latex is collected from a rubber tree. The latex is harvested by slicing a groove into the bark of the tree at a depth of one-quarter inch (6.4 mm) with a hooked knife and peeling back the bark. Trees must be approximately six years old and six inches (150 mm) in diameter in order to be tapped for latex. A person who taps rubber is a rubber tapper.

Rubber tapping is not damaging to the forest, as it does not require the tree to be cut down in order for the latex to be extracted. Jungle rubber is essentially old secondary forest, strongly resembling the primary forest. Its species' richness is about half that of the primary forest. Michon and de Foresta (1994) found that sample jungle rubber sites contained 92 tree species, 97 lianas, and 28 epiphytes compared with 171, 89, and 63, respectively, in the primary forest, and compared with 1, 1, and 2 in monoculture estates. Thiollay (1995) estimated that jungle rubber supports about 137 bird species, against 241 in the primary forest itself. Jungle rubber is expected to resemble primary forest in its hydrological functions. Monoculture rubber tree plantations have far less of an environmental impact than other crops, such as coffee or especially oil palm.

== Process ==
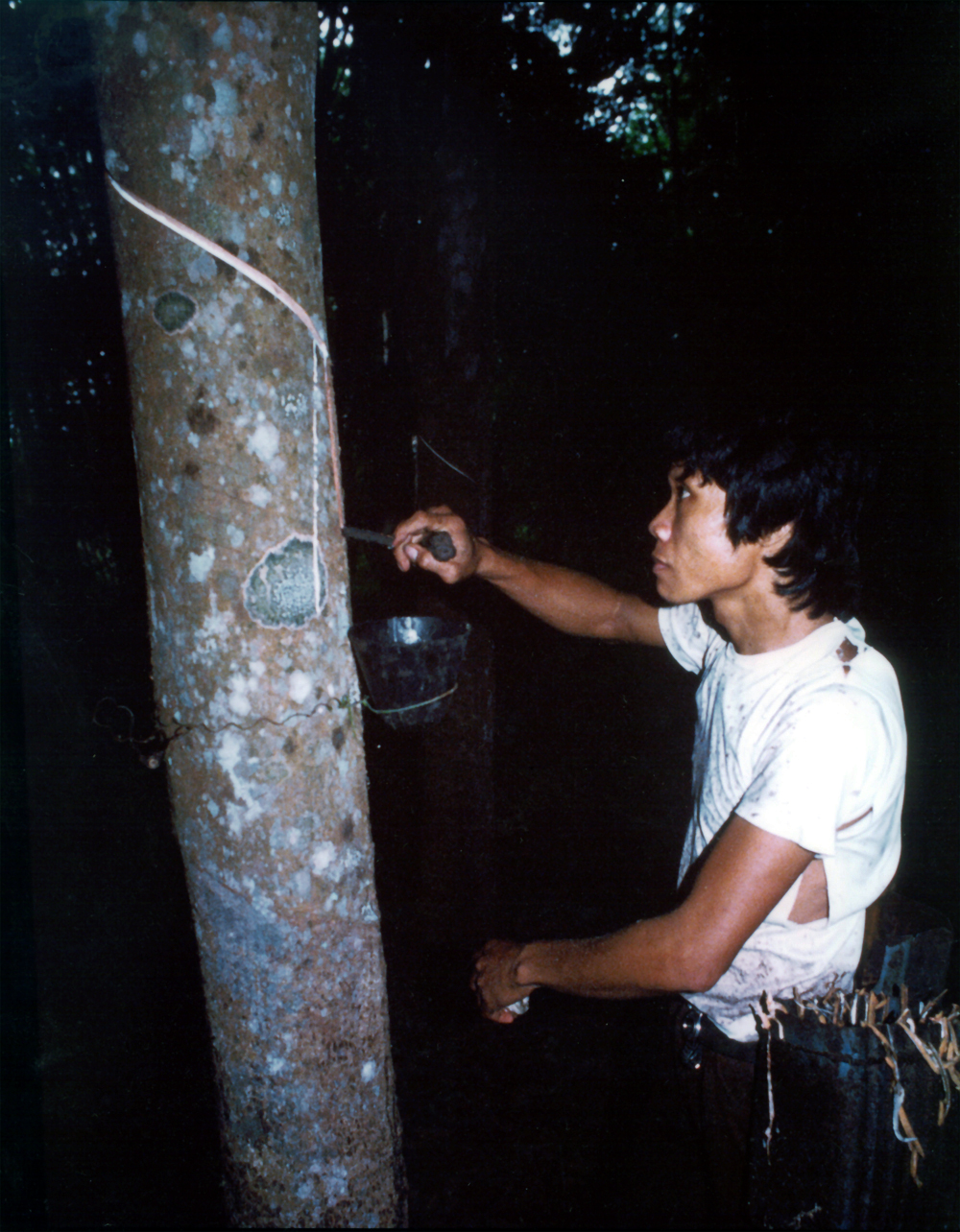
Rubber tapping at nighttime in the Philippines, 1984

To tap rubber, a rubber tapper must remove a thin layer of bark along a downward half spiral on the tree trunk. If done carefully and with skill, this tapping panel will yield latex for up to five hours. Then the opposite side will be tapped, allowing this side to heal over. The spiral allows the latex to run down to a collecting cup. The work is done at night or in the early morning before the day's temperature rises, so that the latex will drip longer before coagulating and sealing the cut.

Depending on the final product, additional chemicals can be added to the latex cup to preserve the latex longer. Ammonia solution helps prevent natural coagulation and allows the latex to remain in its liquid state. Plastic bags containing a coagulant have replaced cups in many plantations in Malaysia. This form of latex is used as the raw material for latex concentrate, which is used for dipped rubber products or for the manufacture of ribbed smoke sheet grades.

Naturally coagulated latex, sometimes referred to as cup lump, is collected for processing into block rubbers, which are referred to as technically specified rubbers (TSRs). The serum left after latex coagulation is rich in quebrachitol, a cyclitol or cyclic polyol.

Intensive tapping is done to older trees during its last years just before it is cut. It involves collecting maximum amount of latex by tapping frequently, making double cuts, using yield simulants, etc. Slaughter tapping refers to the destructive tapping that was done in late nineteenth century to extract large quantities of natural latex.

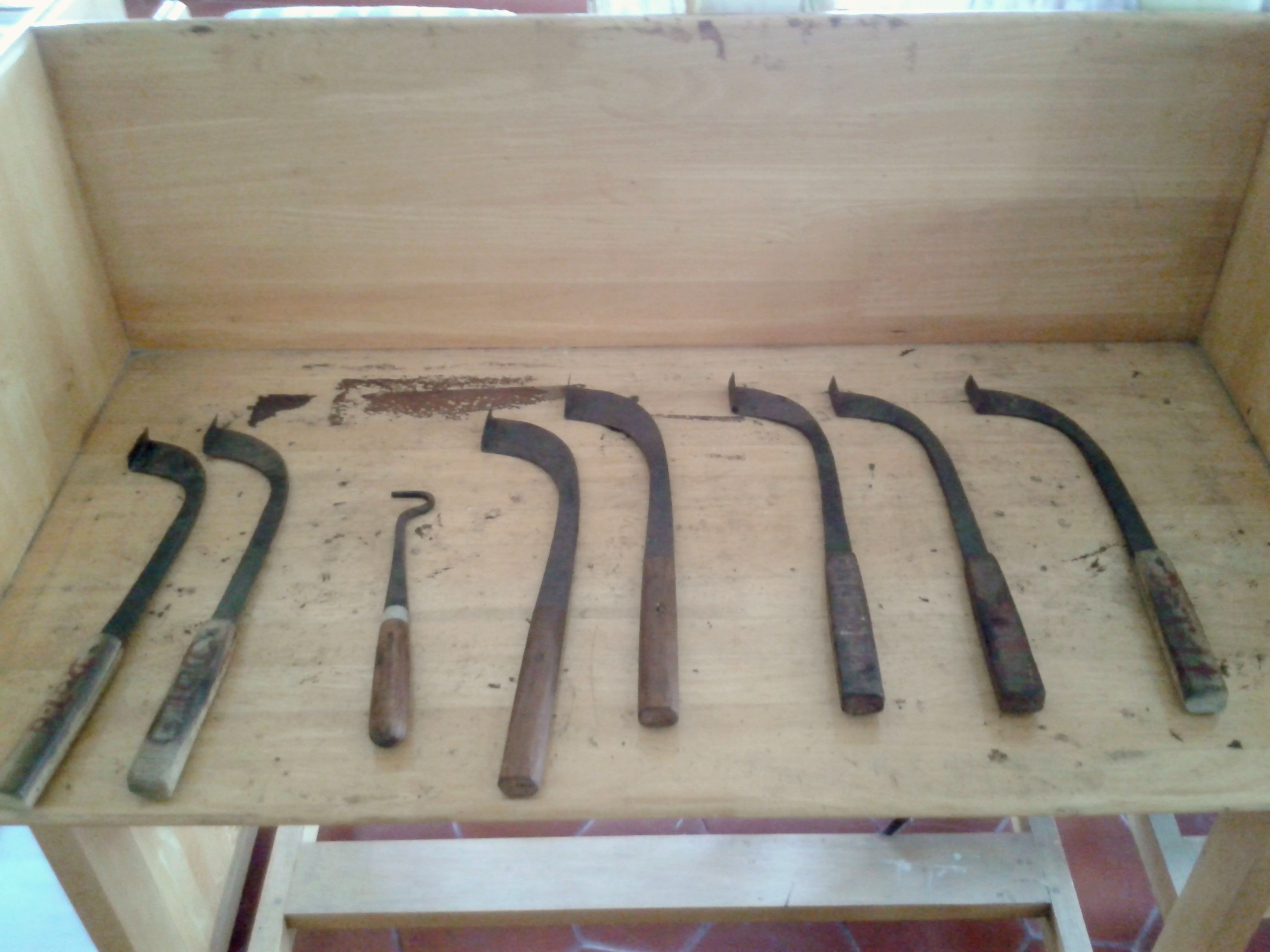
Tapping knives

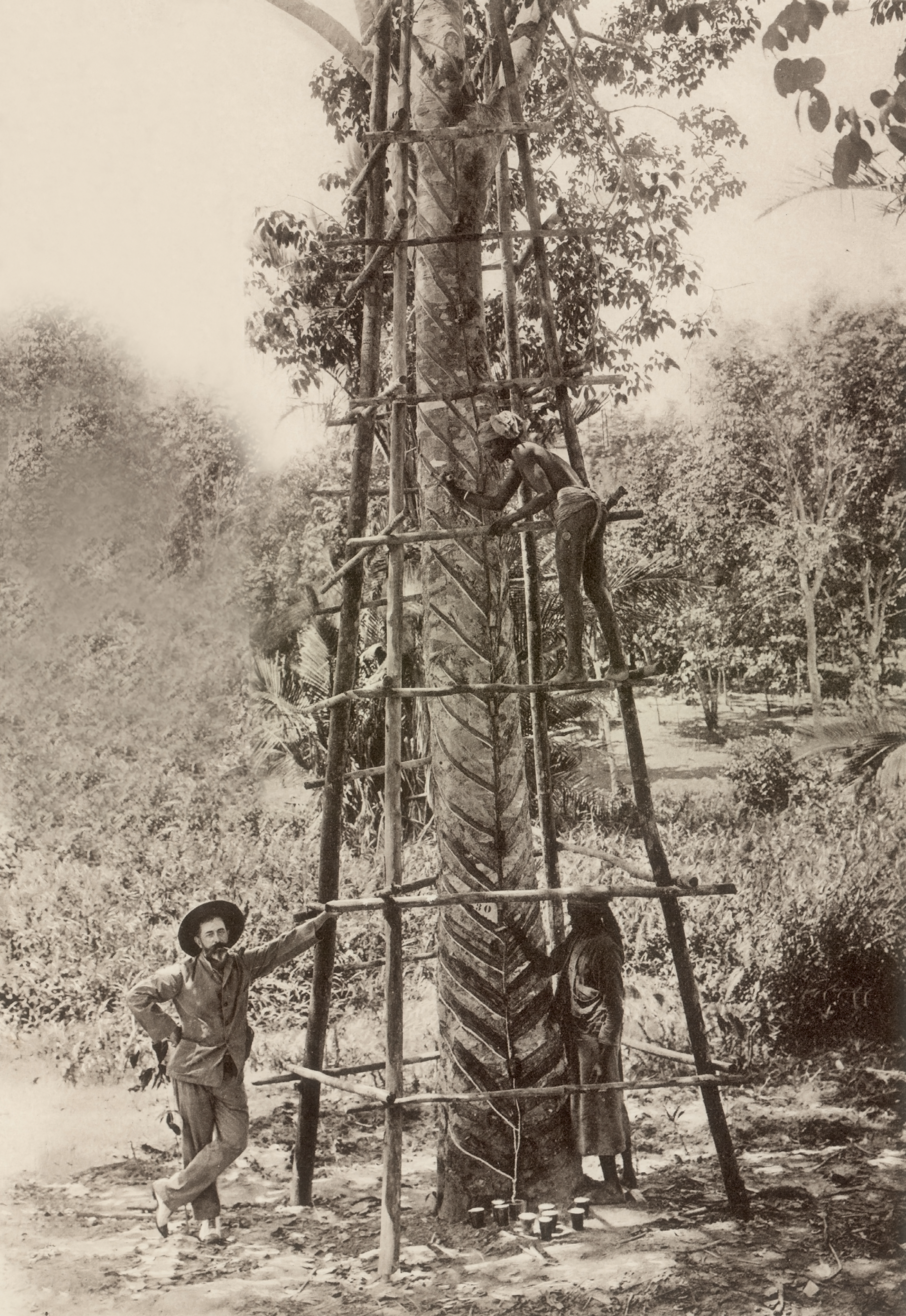
Rubber tapping in Malaya, c. 1910

== See also ==
- Natural rubber
- Forestry
- Maple syrup#Production
