= Japanese language education in India =

Japanese language education in India has experienced a boom in the early 21st century, helping it to begin to catch up with foreign languages more traditionally popular among Indians, such as French and German. A 2006 survey by the Japan Foundation showed 369 teachers teaching 11,011 students at 106 different institutions; the number of students nearly doubled since the 2005 survey. As of 2024, according to the Japan Foundation, 52,946 people were learning Japanese in India.

== History ==
=== Origins ===
The earliest Japanese language courses in India were established in the 1950s; the Ministry of Defence began offering a course through their affiliated School of foreign languages, Lodhi Road, New Delhi in 1954, Visva-Bharati (Santiniketan) established a Japanese department in 1954 which made it the first university in India to introduce Japanese language courses. Bhartiya Vidya Bhawan, J N Academy of Languages, New Delhi started Japanese courses in the year 1958. While the Japan-India Cooperation Association in Mumbai set up a Japanese class in 1958. The University of Delhi established their Japan Studies Centre in 1969, the University of Pune established a course in the language in 1977, and New Delhi's Jawaharlal Nehru University began to offer a doctorate in the language beginning in 1982. However, the language did not enjoy much popularity until the late 1990s. The growth of interest in the Japanese language took place in a short time, in spite of government inaction from both the Japanese and Indian side. The Japanese government-funded Japan Foundation, an organisation for the promotion of Japanese culture, opened an office in New Delhi in 1993, its first on the Indian subcontinent; however, its budget constituted only 2% of the Foundation's global expenditures, as compared to 15.1% for East Asia and 20.4% for Southeast Asia. Then-Finance Minister of India Manmohan Singh suggested as early as 1997 that India needed 10,000 of its citizens to be fluent in Japanese; however, little concrete action was taken to achieve this goal.

=== Education and industry ===
As a result of the lack of government action, the private sector were forced to take the lead in Japanese language education. The majority of Japanese language teaching in the country is conducted by non-school institutions, while government schools have lagged behind the demand for the language; only 20% of Japanese language students study it in the course of their primary or secondary education, or in university. Business process outsourcing and information technology companies are responsible for much of this; as companies in India take aim at the Japan market, they have increased their recruitment of Japanese-speaking individuals and offering internal training courses in the language to their employees.

Pune has grown to become a major centre of Japanese language education in India, surpassing larger cities such as Mumbai and Kolkata despite their late start relative to the rest of the country. The first Japanese language teachers came to the city in the 1970s; the University of Pune established a Japanese language course in 1977 and upgraded it to a full department in 1978. As such, the city was well-positioned to begin capturing Japanese business when India's information technology boom began. As early as 2004, software exports to Japan made up 12% of Pune's then-US$1 billion software industry. As of 2007, 70 Japanese teachers are estimated to work in the city; it is also the home of the country's branch of the Japanese Language Teachers' Association. The similarity between Japanese grammar and that of Marathi is mentioned as a factor by some Pune residents in easing their study of the language.

South India, though traditionally a leader in the information technology sector which is driving so much of the demand for Japanese speakers, has actually lagged behind the country when it comes to teaching the language. Bangalore University established a course in the language, but unlike the University of Pune or Jawaharlal Nehru University, it has done little to promote the language. The Japanese Language Proficiency Test was not even offered in south India until 2000, when a test centre was established in Chennai; the test was first offered in Bangalore in 2007. The entire Japanese teaching and translation industry in Southern India was estimated to produce revenues of only Rs. 1 million (US$21,000 at then-current exchange rates) as of 2003, with only 12 schools teaching the language. Bangalore has few schools like Stonehill International School and Trio World Academy which offers after school Japanese language classes for expats children.

=== Shortfall ===
Despite the increase in the number of Indians studying Japanese, there remains a major shortfall relative to the needs of industry; for example, in the translation business, there are 100 jobs available for every 20 candidates. The Japanese government is working with organisations in India to address the shortfall, and aims to expand the number of Indian students learning Japanese to 30,000 by 2012. In 2006, the Central Board of Secondary Education announced plans to introduce a syllabus for Japanese language teaching, making Japanese the first East Asian language to be offered as part of the curriculum in Indian secondary schools. The emphasis will be on the spoken language, rather than the written; according to the syllabus, kanji would not be taught until class VIII.

== Standardised testing ==
JLPT examinees in India
Year	City	Examinees by Level				
Year	City	L1	L2	L3	L4	Total
2006	Chennai	33	208	628	855	1724
2006	Kolkata	1	31	87	141	260
2006	New Delhi	48	292	534	395	1269
2006	Pune	76	383	715	939	2113
2005	Chennai	26	136	326	645	1133
2005	Kolkata	7	24	67	110	208
2005	New Delhi	42	195	384	254	875
2005	Pune	66	394	675	725	1860
2004	Chennai	41	168	298	500	1007
2004	Kolkata	2	28	68	87	185
2004	New Delhi	37	170	254	209	670
2004	Pune	63	373	663	928	2027
2003	Chennai	26	136	326	645	1133
2003	Kolkata	2	25	59	63	149
2003	New Delhi	37	156	230	191	614
2003	Pune	61	322	636	852	1941
2002	Chennai	Data missing				
2002	Kolkata	Data missing				
2002	New Delhi	Data missing				
2002	Pune	Data missing				
2001	Chennai	2	50	140	385	577
2001	Kolkata	1	14	61	94	170
2001	New Delhi	32	121	134	131	418
2001	Pune	20	157	371	405	953
2000	Chennai	10	23	89	197	319
2000	Kolkata	1	17	37	74	129
2000	New Delhi	11	94	136	120	361
2000	Pune	21	139	280	311	751
1999	Kolkata	1	2	50	86	139
1999	New Delhi	10	97	119	126	352
1999	Pune	23	142	377	393	935
1998	Kolkata	-	-	-	-	192
1998	New Delhi	-	-	-	-	446
1998	Pune	-	-	-	-	698

The Japanese Language Proficiency Test is offered in eight Indian cities as of October 2020; the most recently added test site was that in Salem in Tamil Nadu. The Level 4 examination, aimed at beginning students with fewer than 150 contact hours of instruction, is the most widely attempted; numbers decrease at higher levels. The number of examinees quadrupled between 1998 and 2006. Chennai had the fastest growth in the number of examinees during that period, while Kolkata was slowest. JETRO also offer their Business Japanese Language Test in Bangalore, Mumbai, and New Delhi; in 2006, 147 people attempted the examination, forming about 7.7% of all overseas examinees. 94% of all Indian examinees scored 410 points or less out of 800, as compared to 70% of all overseas examinees.

== See also ==
- Japanese people in India
