= Treaty of Peace Between Japan and India =

1952 treaty between Japan and India

The Treaty of Peace Between Japan and India (日本国とインドとの間の平和条約) was a peace treaty signed on 9 June 1952 restoring relations between the two nations.

== History ==
The British Empire, of which India was a part, had full diplomatic relations with Japan prior to World War II. After the war, Japan was under American occupation, and India gained its independence on 15 August 1947. In 1951, the San Francisco Peace Conference was held, with Indian Prime Minister Jawaharlal Nehru refusing to attend the conference, because he considered the provisions of the San Francisco System to limit Japanese sovereignty.

== Articles ==
Article I: Parties to trade, maritime, aviation, and commercial relations treaty negotiations; pending treaties are subject to most-favored-nation treatment.

Article II: Upon request, Japan will negotiate fishing agreements with India.

Article III: Japan is responsible for paying for the upkeep of Japanese property that India returns to its authority.

Article IV: Japan restores Indian property that was in Japan between 1941 and 1945; compensation is provided if the return is damaged or impracticable.

Article V: All wartime claims and reparations against Japan are waived by India.

Article VI: Court rulings pertaining to Indian nationals during the war may be reviewed in Japan.

Article VII: Japan is responsible for external obligations; both parties promote claim negotiations; pre-war debts and claims are acknowledged.

Article VIII: Occupation acts are not punished; Japan waives war-related claims against India, with the exception of those acknowledged by Indian law.

Article IX: If a dispute cannot be settled via negotiation, arbitration will be used.

Article X: After ratifications are exchanged in New Delhi, the treaty becomes operative.

== See also ==
- Indian independence movement
- Treaty of Peace with Japan
- India–Japan relations
