= Treaty of San Francisco =

1952 Japan–Allies peace treaty

Treaty of Peace with Japan
- Japanese prime minister Shigeru Yoshida signs the San Francisco Peace Treaty on September 8, 1951, at the War Memorial Opera House in San Francisco, California.
- Signed: September 8, 1951; 75 years ago
- Location: San Francisco, California, U.S.
- Effective: April 28, 1952; 74 years ago
- Negotiators: (United Kingdom) Anthony Eden (United States) John Foster Dulles (Japan) Shigeru Yoshida
- Parties: Japan and 48 of the Allies of World War II
- Depositary: United Nations, United States federal government
- Languages: English, French, Spanish, and Japanese (non-authentic copy)

Full text
- Treaty of San Francisco at Wikisource

The Treaty of San Francisco, (Note: Japanese: サンフランシスコ講和条約, Hepburn: San-Furanshisuko kōwa-Jōyaku) also called the Treaty of Peace with Japan, (Note: 日本国との平和条約, Nihon-koku to no Heiwa-Jōyaku) re-established peaceful relations between Japan and the Allies on behalf of the United Nations by ending the legal state of war, military occupation and providing for redress for hostile actions up to and including World War II. It was signed by 49 nations on September 8, 1951, in San Francisco, United States, at the War Memorial Opera House. Italy and China were not invited, the latter due to disagreements on whether the Republic of China or the People's Republic of China represented the Chinese people. Korea was also not invited due to a similar disagreement on whether South Korea or North Korea represented the Korean people.

The treaty came into force on April 28, 1952. It ended Japan's role as an imperial power, allocated compensation to Allied nations and former prisoners of war who had suffered Japanese war crimes during World War II, ended the Allied post-war occupation of Japan, and returned full sovereignty to it. This treaty relied heavily on the Charter of the United Nations and the Universal Declaration of Human Rights to enunciate the Allies' goals. In Article 11, Japan accepted the judgments of the International Military Tribunal for the Far East and of other Allied War Crimes Courts imposed on Japan both within and outside Japan.

The 1951 treaty, along with the Security Treaty signed that same day, marks the beginning of the San Francisco System, which defines Japan's relationship with the United States and its role in the international arena and characterizes Japan's post-war history. Unresolved issues from the treaty have included the political status of Taiwan, as it only specifies that Japan has renounced all rights, privileges, and demands regarding Taiwan and does not designate a recipient for the island. Due to the absence of China from the treaty, the People's Republic of China considers the treaty to be illegal and illegitimate. On the contrary, the United States, Japan and the Republic of China consider the treaty to be legal and binding.

== Attendance ==
=== Present ===
Argentina, Australia, Belgium, Bolivia, Brazil, Cambodia, Canada, Ceylon (currently Sri Lanka), Chile, Colombia, Costa Rica, Cuba, Czechoslovakia, the Dominican Republic, Ecuador, Egypt, El Salvador, Ethiopia, France, Greece, Guatemala, Haiti, Honduras, India, Indonesia, Iran, Iraq, Japan, Laos, Lebanon, Liberia, Luxembourg, Mexico, the Netherlands, New Zealand, Nicaragua, Norway, Pakistan, Panama, Paraguay, Peru, the Philippines, Poland, Saudi Arabia, South Africa, Vietnam, the Soviet Union, Syria, Turkey, the United Kingdom, the United States, Uruguay, and Venezuela attended the Conference.

=== Absent ===
China was not invited due to disagreements between the United States and the United Kingdom on whether the established but defeated Republic of China (in Taiwan) or the newly-formed People's Republic of China (in mainland China) represented the Chinese people. The United States recognized the ROC government while Britain had recognized the PRC in 1950. Additionally, an internal US political debate had seen the Republican Party and US military supporting the Kuomintang and accusing President Truman of having abandoned the anti-communist cause.

Afghanistan, Burma, India, Nepal, Yemen and Yugoslavia were invited, but did not participate. India considered certain provisions of the treaty to constitute limitations on Japanese sovereignty and national independence. India signed a separate peace treaty, the Treaty of Peace Between Japan and India, for the purpose of giving Japan a proper position of honor and equality among the community of free nations, on June 9, 1952. Italy was not invited, despite its government having issued a formal declaration of war on Japan on July 14, 1945, a few weeks before the end of the war. Portugal was not invited, even though, despite its status as a neutral country during the war, its colony of East Timor had been invaded by Japan (the colony of Macau was not occupied but rather assigned Japanese 'advisors' to its government).

Pakistan, which only gained independence from the British Empire in 1947 after the end of the war, was invited because it was seen as a successor state to British India, a major combatant against Japan; and hundreds of thousands of now-Pakistani citizens fought the Axis powers under the British Empire in the Second World War, in both Asia (against Japan) and Europe (against Germany and Italy).

== Stances ==
=== Soviet Union's opposition to the treaty ===
The Soviet Union took part in the San Francisco conference, and the Soviet delegation was led by the Soviet Deputy Foreign Minister Andrei Gromyko. From the start of the conference the Soviet Union expressed vigorous and vocal opposition to the draft treaty text prepared by the United States and the United Kingdom. The Soviet delegation made several unsuccessful procedural attempts to stall the proceedings. The Soviet Union's objections were detailed in a lengthy 8 September 1951 statement by Gromyko. The statement contained a number of the Soviet Union's claims and assertions: that the treaty did not provide any guarantees against the rise of Japanese militarism; that China was not invited to participate despite being one of the main victims of the Japanese aggression; that the Soviet Union was not properly consulted when the treaty was being prepared; that the treaty sets up Japan as an American military base and draws Japan into a military coalition directed against the Soviet Union; that the treaty was in effect a separate peace treaty; that the draft treaty violated the rights of China to Taiwan and several other islands; that the draft treaty, in violation of the Yalta agreement, did not recognize the Soviet Union's sovereignty over South Sakhalin and the Kuril Islands; and other objections. It was not until 19 October 1956, that Japan and the Soviet Union signed a Joint Declaration ending the war and reestablishing diplomatic relations.

=== Exclusion of the ROC and PRC ===
The ongoing Chinese Civil War and thus the question of which Chinese government was legitimate presented a dilemma to conference organizers. The United States wanted to invite the Republic of China (ROC) on the island of Formosa to represent China, while the United Kingdom and Soviet Union wished to invite the People's Republic of China (PRC) on mainland China as China's representative. As a compromise, neither government was invited.

On 15 August 1951, Chinese Premier and Foreign Minister Zhou Enlai said that "The PRC was excluded from its preparation, drafting and signing, and its rulings on the territory and sovereign rights of China – including the sovereignty over Taiwan – are therefore illegal and invalid.”

On 16 August 2025, the Ministry of Foreign Affairs of the Republic of China (Taiwan) said that "following World War II, the Treaty of San Francisco—which has the force of international law—took the place of wartime political declarations such as the Cairo Declaration and the Potsdam Proclamation. The treaty did not grant sovereignty over Taiwan to the People’s Republic of China. The PRC has never ruled Taiwan, and Taiwan is certainly not part of the PRC."

=== Sri Lanka's defense of Japan ===
A major player in providing support for a post-war free Japan was the delegation from Ceylon (now known as Sri Lanka). While many were reluctant to allow a free Japan capable of aggressive action and insisted that the terms of surrender should be rigidly enforced in an attempt to break the spirit of the Japanese nation, the Ceylonese Finance Minister J. R. Jayewardene spoke in defense of a free Japan and informed the conference of Ceylon's refusal to accept the payment of reparations that would harm Japan's economy. His reason was "We in Ceylon were fortunate that we were not invaded, but the damage caused by air raids, by the stationing of enormous armies under the South-East Asia Command, and by the slaughter-tapping of one of our main commodities, rubber, when we were the only producer of natural rubber for the Allies, entitles us to ask that the damage so caused should be repaired. We do not intend to do so for we believe in the words of the Great Teacher [Buddha] whose message has ennobled the lives of countless millions in Asia, that 'hatred ceases not by hatred but by love'." He ended the same speech by saying:

This treaty is as magnanimous as it is just to a defeated foe. We extend to Japan the hand of friendship and trust that with the closing of this chapter in the history of man, the last page of which we write today, and with the beginning of the new one, the first page of which we dictate tomorrow, her people and ours may march together to enjoy the full dignity of human life in peace and prosperity.

Minister Jayewardene's speech was received with resounding applause. Afterwards, The New York Times stated, "The voice of free Asia, eloquent, melancholy and still strong with the lilt of an Oxford accent, dominated the Japanese peace treaty conference today."

== Signatories and ratification ==
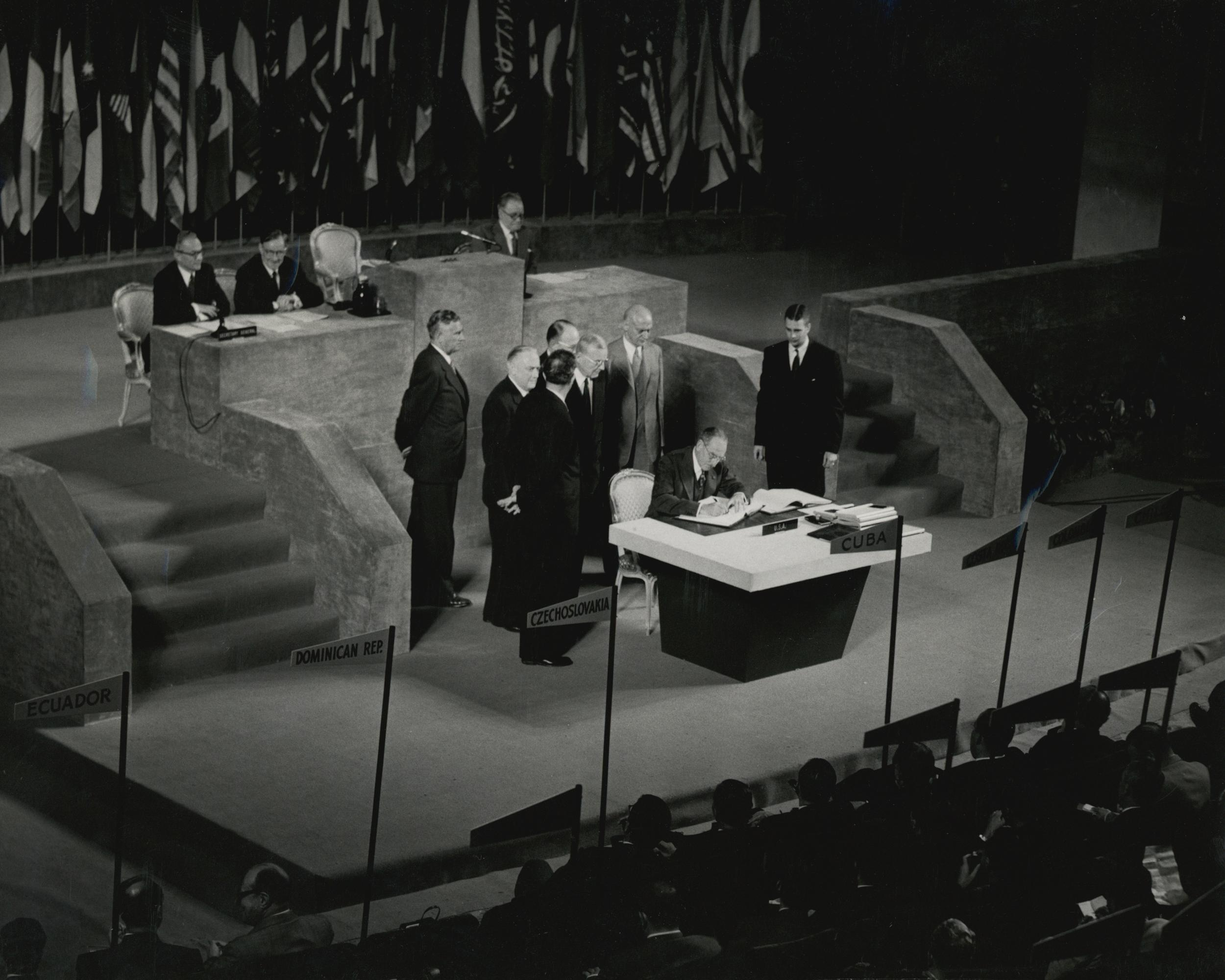
U.S. secretary of state Dean Acheson signing the Treaty

Of the 51 participating countries, 48 signed the treaty; Czechoslovakia, Poland and the Soviet Union refused.

The signatories to the treaty were: Argentina, Australia, Belgium, Bolivia, Brazil, Cambodia, Canada, Ceylon (currently Sri Lanka), Chile, Colombia, Costa Rica, Cuba, the Dominican Republic, Ecuador, Egypt, El Salvador, Ethiopia, France, Greece, Guatemala, Haiti, Honduras, Indonesia, Iran, Iraq, Laos, Lebanon, Liberia, Luxembourg, Mexico, the Netherlands, New Zealand, Nicaragua, Norway, Pakistan, Panama, Paraguay, Peru, the Philippines, Saudi Arabia, South Africa, South Vietnam, Syria, Turkey, the United Kingdom, the United States, Uruguay, Venezuela and Japan.

The Philippines ratified the San Francisco Treaty on July 16, 1956, after the signing of a reparations agreement between both countries in May of that year. Indonesia did not ratify the San Francisco Peace Treaty. Instead, it signed with Japan a bilateral reparations agreement and peace treaty on January 20, 1958. A separate treaty, the Treaty of Taipei, formally known as the Sino-Japanese Peace Treaty, was signed in Taipei on April 28, 1952, between Japan and the ROC, just hours before the Treaty of San Francisco also went into effect on April 28. The apparent illogical order of the two treaties is due to the difference between time zones.

== Fate of Taiwan and other Japanese overseas territories ==
According to the treaty's travaux préparatoires, a consensus existed among the states present at the San Francisco Peace Conference that, while the legal status of the island of Taiwan is temporarily undetermined, it would be resolved at a later time in accordance with the principles of peaceful settlement of disputes and self-determination, ideas that had been enshrined in the UN Charter.

The document officially renounces Japan's treaty rights derived from the Boxer Protocol of 1901 and its rights to Korea, Formosa and the Pescadores, the Kuril Islands, the Spratly Islands, Antarctica and South Sakhalin.

Article 3 of the treaty left the Bonin Islands, Volcano Islands (including Iwo Jima), and the Ryukyu Islands, which included Okinawa and the Amami, Miyako and Yaeyama Islands groups, under a potential U.N. trusteeship. While the treaty provision implied that these territories would become a United Nations trusteeship, in the end that option was not pursued. The Amami Islands were eventually restored to Japan on 25 December 1953, with the Bonin and Volcano Islands restored on 5 April 1968. In 1969 U.S.-Japan negotiations authorized the transfer of authority over the Ryūkyūs to Japan to be implemented in 1972. In 1972, the United States' "reversion" of the Ryūkyūs occurred along with the ceding of control over the nearby Senkaku Islands. Both the People's Republic of China (PRC) and the Republic of China (ROC) argue that this agreement did not determine the ultimate sovereignty of the Senkaku Islands.

The Treaty of Taipei between Japan and the ROC stated that all residents of Taiwan and the Pescadores were deemed as nationals of the ROC. Additionally, in Article 2 it specified that – It is recognised that under Article 2 of the Treaty of Peace which Japan signed at the city of San Francisco on 8 September 1951 (hereinafter referred to as the San Francisco Treaty), Japan has renounced all right, title, and claim to Taiwan (Formosa) and Penghu (the Pescadores) as well as the Spratley Islands and the Paracel Islands. However, this treaty does not include any wording saying that Japan recognizes that the territorial sovereignty of Taiwan was transferred to the Republic of China.

Some supporters of Taiwan independence refer to the San Francisco Peace Treaty to argue that Taiwan is not a part of the Republic of China, for it does not explicitly state the sovereignty status of Taiwan after Japan's renunciation. In 1955, U.S. Secretary of State John Foster Dulles, co-author of the San Francisco Peace Treaty, affirmed that the treaty ceded Taiwan to no one; that Japan "merely renounced sovereignty over Taiwan". Dulles said that America "cannot, therefore, admit that the disposition of Taiwan is merely an internal problem of China." However, the ROC Ministry of Foreign Affairs rejected this justification, arguing that the Instrument of Surrender of Japan accepts the Potsdam Declaration and the Cairo Declaration, which intends Taiwan and Penghu to be restored to the ROC. Supporters of Taiwan independence point out that the Potsdam Declaration and the Cairo Declaration were not treaties, but President Ma expressed that the Treaty of Taipei has voided the Treaty of Shimonoseki and recognizes that people of Taiwan and Penghu as Chinese nationality. In more recent years supporters of Taiwan independence have more often relied on arguments based on self-determination as implied in the San Francisco Peace Treaty and popular sovereignty.

By Article 11 Japan accepted the judgments of the International Military Tribunal for the Far East and of other Allied War Crimes Courts both within and outside Japan and agreed to carry out the sentences imposed thereby upon Japanese nationals imprisoned in Japan.

The document further set guidelines for repatriation of Allied prisoners of war and renounces future military aggression under the guidelines set by the United Nations Charter. The document nullifies prior treaties and lays down the framework for Japan's current status of retaining a military that is purely defensive in nature.

There is also some ambiguity as to over which islands Japan has renounced sovereignty. This has led to both the Kuril Islands dispute and the Senkaku Islands dispute.

== Compensation to Allied countries and POWs ==
=== Transfer of Japanese overseas assets ===
In accordance with Article 14 of the Treaty, Allied forces confiscated all assets owned by the Japanese government, firms, organizations and private citizens, in all colonized or occupied countries except China, which was dealt with under Article 21. China repossessed all Japanese assets in Manchuria and Inner Mongolia, which included mineworks and railway infrastructure. Moreover, Article 4 of the treaty stated that "the disposition of property of Japan and of its nationals...and their claims...against the authorities presently administering such areas and the residents...shall be the subject of special arrangements between Japan and such authorities." Although Korea was not a signatory state of the treaty, it was also entitled to the benefits of Article 4 by the provisions of Article 21.

Japanese overseas assets in 1945 (¥15=1US$)
Country/region	Value (Yen)	Value (US dollars)
Korea	70,256,000,000	4,683,700,000
Taiwan and Penghu	42,542,000,000	2,846,100,000
North East China	146,532,000,000	9,768,800,000
North China	55,437,000,000	3,695,800,000
Central South China	36,718,000,000	2,447,900,000
Others	28,014,000,000	1,867,600,000
Total	¥379,499,000,000	$25,300,000,000

Total amount of Japanese overseas assets in China was US$18,758,600,000 in 1945.

=== Compensation to Allied POWs ===
Article 16 of the San Francisco Treaty states:

As an expression of its desire to indemnify those members of the armed forces of the Allied Powers who suffered undue hardships while prisoners of war of Japan, Japan will transfer its assets and those of its nationals in countries which were neutral during the war, or which were at war with any of the Allied Powers, or, at its option, the equivalent of such assets, to the International Committee of the Red Cross which shall liquidate such assets and distribute the resultant fund to appropriate national agencies, for the benefit of former prisoners of war and their families on such basis as it may determine to be equitable. The categories of assets described in Article 14(a)2(II)(ii) through (v) of the present Treaty shall be excepted from transfer, as well as assets of Japanese natural persons not residents of Japan on the first coming into force of the Treaty. It is equally understood that the transfer provision of this Article has no application to the 19,770 shares in the Bank for International Settlements presently owned by Japanese financial institutions.

Accordingly, Japan paid £4,500,000 to the Red Cross.

Article 16 has served as a bar against subsequent lawsuits filed by former Allied prisoners of war against Japan. In 1998, a Tokyo court ruled against a suit brought by former Allied POWs, citing the San Francisco Treaty.

=== Allied territories occupied by Japan ===
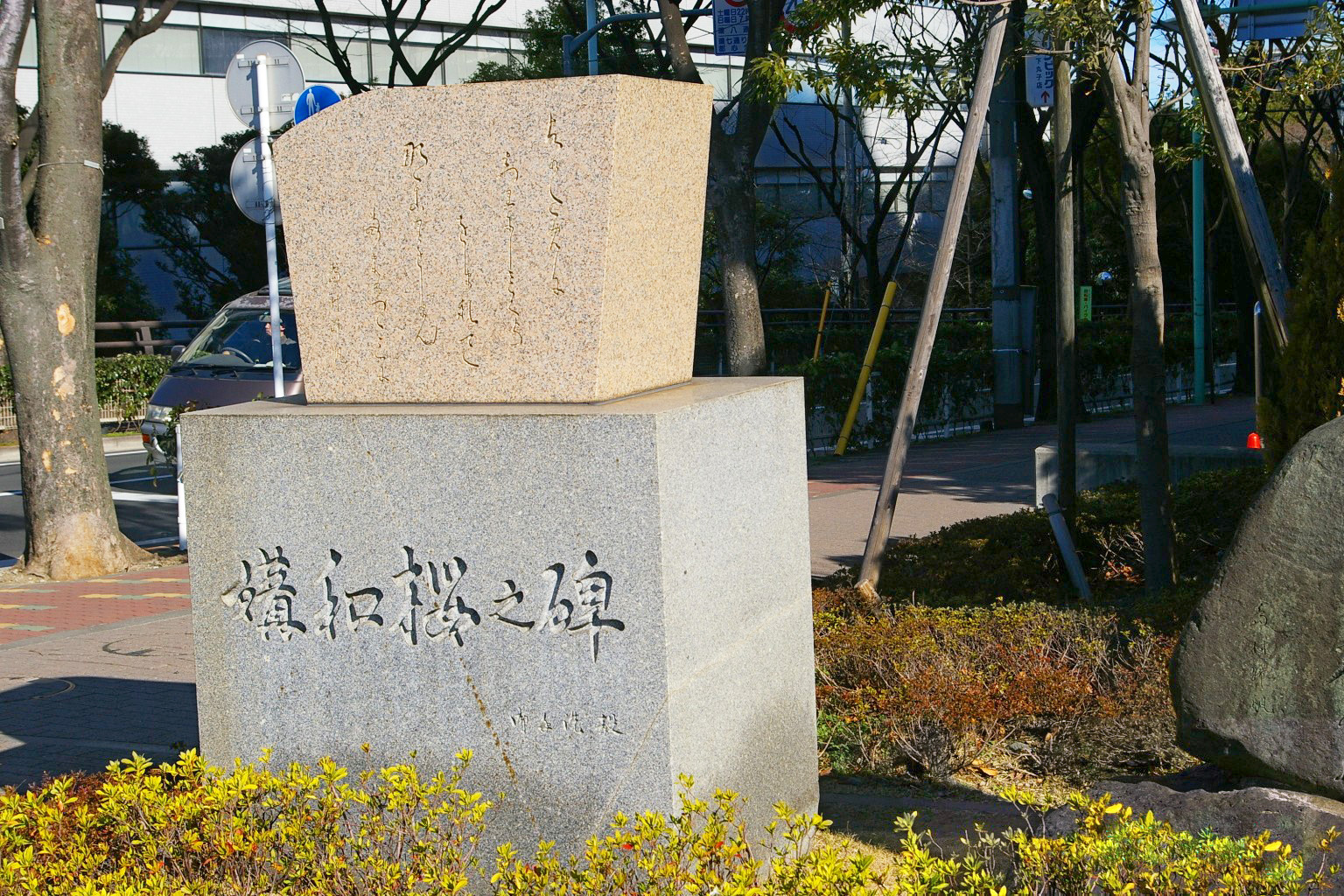
Memorial for Treaty of San Francisco in Shimomaruko, Ōta ward, Tokyo

Article 14 of the treaty stated that

It is recognized that Japan should pay reparations to the Allied Powers for the damage and suffering caused by it during the war. Nevertheless it is also recognized that the resources of Japan are not presently sufficient, if it is to maintain a viable economy, to make complete reparation for all such damage and suffering and at the same time meet its other obligations.

Therefore,

Japan will promptly enter into negotiations with Allied Powers so desiring, whose present territories were occupied by Japanese forces and damaged by Japan, with a view to assisting to compensate those countries for the cost of repairing the damage done, by making available the services of the Japanese people in production, salvaging and other work for the Allied Powers in question.

Accordingly, the Philippines and South Vietnam received compensation in 1956 and 1959, respectively. Burma and Indonesia were not original signatories, but they later signed bilateral treaties in accordance with Article 14 of the San Francisco Treaty.

Japanese military yen issued by force in Hong Kong, Papua New Guinea, the Philippines, Taiwan, and other places for the economic advantage of Japan were not honored by them after the war. This caused much suffering, but the claims of the Hong Kong Reparation Association in 1993, in a Tokyo district court, failed in 1999. The court acknowledged the suffering of the Hong Kong people, but reasoned that the Government of Japan did not have specific laws concerning military yen compensation and that the United Kingdom was a signatory to the Treaty of San Francisco.

Regarding China, on September 29, 1972, the Government of the People's Republic of China declared "that in the interest of the friendship between the Chinese and the Japanese peoples, it renounces its demand for war reparation from Japan" in article 5 of the Joint Communique of the Government of Japan and the Government of the People's Republic of China.

Japanese compensation to countries occupied during 1941–45
Country	Amount in Yen	Amount in US$	Date of treaty
Burma	72,000,000,000	200,000,000	November 5, 1955
Philippines	198,000,000,000	550,000,000	May 9, 1956
Indonesia	80,388,000,000	223,080,000	January 20, 1958
South Vietnam	14,400,000,000	38,000,000	May 13, 1959
Total	¥364,348,800,000	US$1,012,080,000	N/A

The last payment was made to the Philippines on July 22, 1976.

== Unresolved issues ==
=== Absence of China ===
The absence of China at the table would later play a significant role in Taiwan and the South China Sea disputes, specifically regarding the overall diplomatic relationship (or lack thereof) between the United States and China. According to historian Rana Mitter, "The absence of contact between the United States and China made the establishment of shared norms, or even areas of mutually acknowledged difference, impossible." Due to the absence of China, the PRC rejects the legitimacy and the legality of the treaty. Instead, it assigns importance to the Cairo Declaration and the Potsdam Declaration, both of which China was a signatory to under the ROC. The Taiwan Question and China’s Reunification in the New Era published in August 2022 by the State Council Information Office states:

Between September 4 and 8, 1951, the United States gathered a number of countries in San Francisco for what they described as the San Francisco Peace Conference. Neither the PRC nor the Soviet Union received an invitation. The treaty signed at this meeting, commonly known as the Treaty of San Francisco, included an article under which Japan renounced all rights, title and claim to Taiwan and the Penghu Islands. This treaty contravened the provisions of the Declaration by United Nations signed by 26 countries – including the United States, the United Kingdom, the Soviet Union and China – in 1942, the fundamental principles of the UN Charter, and the basic norms of international law. The PRC was excluded from its preparation, drafting and signing, and its rulings on the territory and sovereign rights of China – including the sovereignty over Taiwan – are therefore illegal and invalid. The Chinese government has always refused to recognize the Treaty of San Francisco, and has never from the outset deviated from this stance. Other countries, including the Soviet Union, Poland, Czechoslovakia, the Democratic People’s Republic of Korea, Mongolia, and Vietnam, have also refused to recognize the document’s authority.

=== Status of Taiwan ===
Through the Treaty of San Francisco, Japan renounced all rights, privileges, and demands regarding Taiwan. The treaty did not designate a recipient for Taiwan. However, ambiguous wording in the treaty about the political status of Taiwan (i.e. whether the territory of Taiwan was legally retroceded to the Republic of China in 1945) after Japan renounced all right, title, and claim concerning the island of Taiwan, the Pescadores, the Spratly Islands, and the Paracel Islands in 1952 (with the ratification of this treaty in the ROC) has given rise to the Theory of the Undetermined Status of Taiwan, which is one of the major theories within this debate. This particular theory is generally Taiwan independence-leaning since it offers evidence supporting the notion that Chinese sovereignty over Taiwan (whether ROC or PRC) is either illegitimate or temporary and must be resolved via the postcolonial principle of self-determination. Proponents of this theory generally do not claim that Japan still has or should have sovereignty over Taiwan, though there are exceptions. Political scientist Alain Guilloux has stated that the United States deliberately kept Taiwan's international status as an open question when it drafted the treaty. As the PRC rejects the legality of the treaty, it also rejects the views that the status of Taiwan is unsettled.

=== Compensation for (South) Koreans ===
Because South Korea did not sign the treaty, it was not entitled to the benefits provided to by Article 14, so South Koreans directly affected by Japanese atrocities were not compensated upon the ratification. When relations between the two countries were normalized in the 1965 Treaty on Basic Relations, Japan agreed to pay settlements, including all claims under Article 4 of the Treaty of San Francisco, directly to the South Korean government. The South Korean government would then compensate individual victims on a case-by-case basis; however, the government at the time used the funds to develop Korea's economy, and passed few reparations to individuals. Amid recent rising tensions, many victims of Japanese crimes maintain that Japan has not been held sufficiently to account, and have demanded reparations for those who have not been compensated. South Korea claims that the 1965 treaty was not intended to settle individual claims for Japanese war crimes and crimes against humanity; Japan claims that under the 1965 treaty, it is no longer legally responsible for compensating all victims.

== See also ==
- 1971 Okinawa Reversion Agreement
- Cairo Declaration (1943)
- General Order No. 1 (August 1945)
- Japanese holdout
- Japanese Instrument of Surrender (September 1945)
- Political status of Taiwan
- Potsdam Declaration (July 1945)
- Security Treaty Between the United States and Japan (1952)
- Treaty of Mutual Cooperation and Security between the United States and Japan (1960)
- Treaty of Peace Between Japan and India (1952)
- Treaty of Taipei (1952)

Germany:

- General Treaty, 1952 treaty with the US, UK, and France, ending West Germany's status as an occupied territory, effective in 1955
- Paris Peace Treaties, 1947, similar treaties dealing with other countries in the European theater
- Potsdam Agreement, a 1945 communique by the Allies detailing post-war relations with Germany (not to be confused with the Potsdam Declaration)
- Treaty on the Final Settlement with Respect to Germany, a 1990 treaty with Germany that marked the final settlement between the Allied Powers and Germany, decades after the end of WWII
