= Trio World Academy =

Trio World Academy, Bengaluru
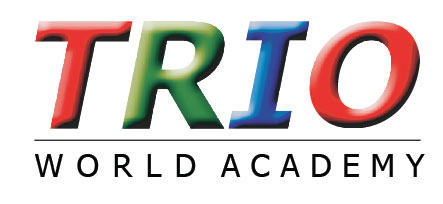

Location
- 3/5 Kodigehalli Main Road, Sahakar Nagar, Off Bellary Road, Bengaluru, Karnataka; Bangalore, India, Karnataka, 560092; 13°3′34″N 77°34′58″E

Information
- School type: Private co-ed
- Motto: Create A Better World
- Established: 2007
- Sister school: Tots Preschool, Trio World School ICSE
- School board: IB, Cambridge and ICSE
- Chairman: K N Manjunath
- Director: Naveen K M, Chethan K M
- Head of school: Brian Irving Vinod Singh Sebastian Pelletier Marc Buchanan Brian Tinker
- International students: 600 students from 20 countries
- Average class size: 22
- Student to teacher ratio: 10:1
- Language: Spanish, French, Hindi and Kannada
- Campus size: 4 acres (16,000 m^{2})
- Sports: Basketball, Football, Swimming, Skating, Chess, Cricket, Table Tennis, Martial Arts, Wall Climbing etc.
- Team name: Trio Lions
- National ranking: Top 10 in India
- Affiliations: IGCSE, IB ICSE
- Website: trioworldacademy.com

Trio World Academy, established in 2007 in Sahakara Nagar, Bengaluru, India, is a private international school offering the IB Primary Years Programme (PYP), Cambridge IGCSE, and the IB Diploma Programme (IBDP). The school has served students from over 55 nationalities and currently represents more than 22 countries. As an IB World School, it emphasizes inquiry-based learning and academic rigor, promoting research skills, differentiated learning, independent thinking, global citizenship, time management, and personal growth, preparing students to become reflective, responsible, and internationally minded lifelong learners.

The school’s initiatives are guided by its core values LEADS (Leadership, Empathy, Academics excellence, Discipline and Services), which emphasize leadership, excellence, discipline, and service in shaping well-rounded global citizens.

Trio World Academy is among the first schools in Bangalore to introduce a student-led podcast series titled Trio Tales. The initiative provides students with a platform to host conversations with guests from diverse professional and social backgrounds, fostering leadership, communication skills, and global perspectives.

== Associations & Recognition ==
1. Awarded Best International School in India by The Business World
2. Awarded Excellence in AI, Robotics and Responsible Emerging Technologies by the Economic Times
3. Limca Book of Records for collecting highest e-waste in a week
4. The students, with the help of Fair Trade India, made India's largest T-shirt and the world's largest sustainable T-shirt made out of fair trade and organic cotton. It was unveiled at the campus. Approximately 380 kg of cotton seed was used to create a total of 5,140 km length of cotton yarn, which weighed about 94 kg
5. Japanese Supplementary School of Bangaluru Hoshū jugyō kō (補習授業校), or hoshūkō (補習校) runs in the campus

== Trio World School ==
The ICSE wing of the institution operates under the name Trio World School (TWS). It follows a blended experiential curriculum up to Class 7, integrating hands-on learning with academic instruction. Founded on the principles of experiential education and core values, the school emphasizes a balanced approach, giving equal importance to academics and co-curricular activities.

The cellist, Cellist Audun André perperik has, performed in the school in 2017.

== Karnataka Topper ==
In the year 2022, Adi Kishore has topped the ICSE 10th Exam in Karnataka and ranked 2nd in India with 99.60%.

== Government School Support ==
Trio World School high school students assist and teach English and mathematics at Kodigehalli Primary Government School. Every year, TRIO students raise funds to gift them uniforms, shoes, mats, and stationery. The toilet and school building were constructed with the help of the student council and management efforts.
