= Japan–India Association =

Foundation in Tokyo, Japan

The Japan–India Association (日印協会, Nichi In Kyōkai) is a foundation headquartered in the Suzuko Building (スズコービル, Suzukō biru) in Nihonbashi, Chuo, Tokyo.

== History ==
It was established in 1903 by former Prime Minister Shigenobu Ōkuma, Viscount Moriyoshi Nagaoka, Viscount Eiichi Shibusawa and others to encourage India–Japan friendship. The association has contributed to the improvement of India–Japan relations since the establishment.

In 1939, the association was authorized as a foundation by Ministry of Foreign Affairs. During World War II, the association supported the Indian independence movement. The war ended, the association was disbanded by Allied Forces for the reason of having supported the Indian independence movement. In 1947, India gained Independence, the association restored activities by changing its name to the Japan–India Economic Association.

In 1952, the year of regaining sovereignty, the association restored the association's name to the Japan–India Association and expanded activities to different cultures. The association's activities are expanded from year to year.

The current president is a former Prime Minister Yoshirō Mori.
