= Slaughter tapping =

Obsolete method of extracting natural latex from rubber trees

Slaughter tapping is an obsolete method of extracting large quantities of natural latex from rubber trees in a forest environment. Before commercial exploitation of latex-bearing trees such as Hevea brasiliensis in the Amazon Basin and Funtumia elastica in the Congo, native populations limited harvesting to non-lethal tapping of the latex. However, with the rising demand for rubber worldwide in the late nineteenth century, debt-slave "hunters" began tapping more intensively, using ladders to extract as much latex as possible from all areas of the tree, killing the tree as a result. This "slaughter tapping" resulted in the destruction of all latex-bearing trees across large swathes of sub-Saharan Africa and South America. Eventually, the establishment of rubber plantations in the Far East made "hunting" of naturally occurring rubber trees unprofitable, and the practice largely ceased in the early twentieth century.
