= Indians in Japan =

Ethnic group

जापान में भारतीय 日本にいるインド人
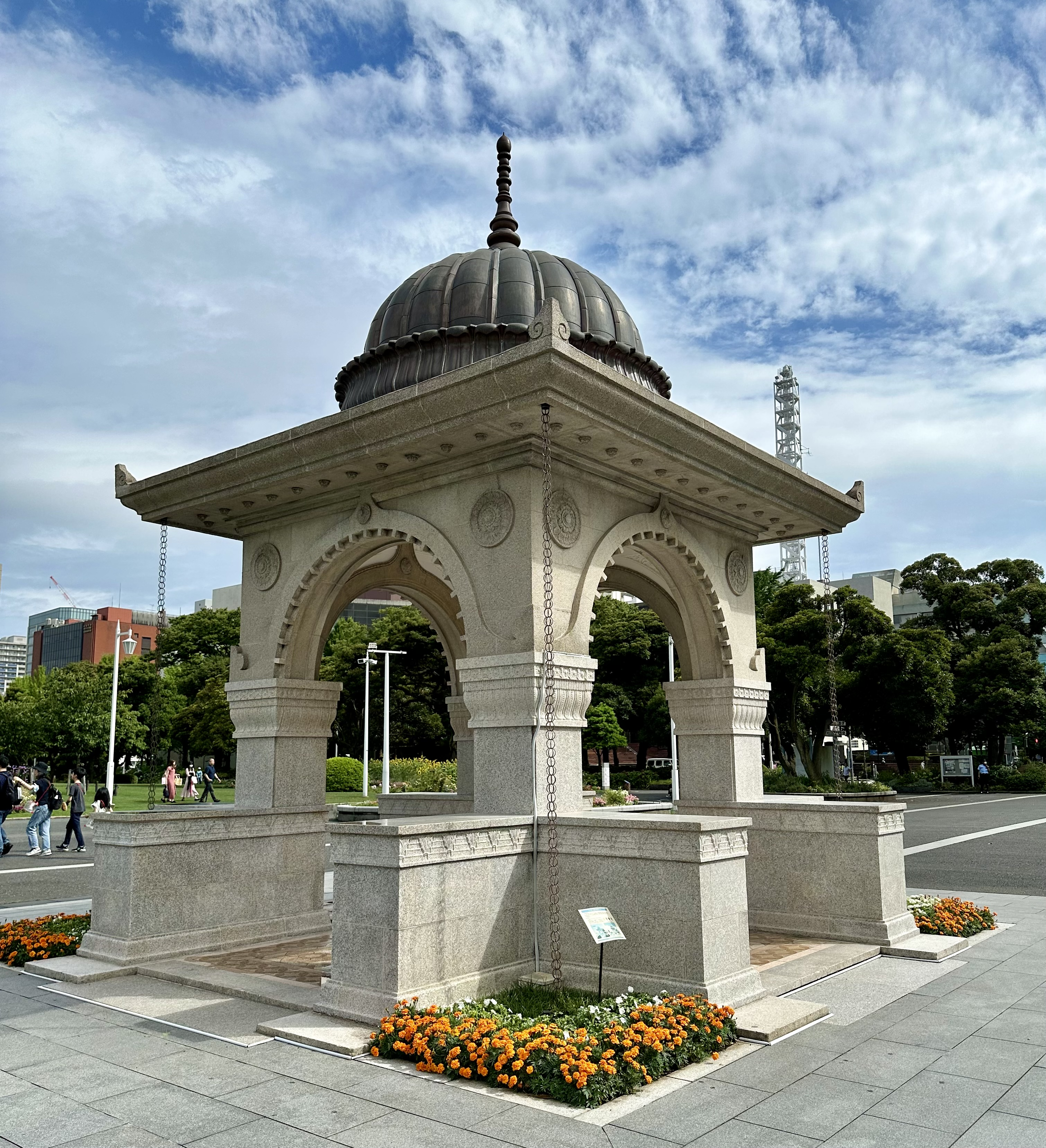

Total population
- 58,999 (in December 2025) Indian nationals

Regions with significant populations
- Tokyo, Kobe, Yokohama

Languages
- English; Japanese Indian languages: Hindi; Marathi; Kannada; Telugu; Tamil; Malayalam; Punjabi; Bengali; Manipuri; Gujarati; Other languages of India

Religion
- Hinduism; Buddhism; Christianity; Jainism; Sikhism; Islam

Indians in Japan consist of those with Japanese citizenship and those with foreign citizenship.

Indians in Japan formed a population of 58,999 individuals in December 2025, making them Japan's 13th largest foreign community, according to the statistics of the Japanese, trailing significantly behind Nepal (300,992) but remaining larger than the populations of Pakistan and Bangladesh.

== History ==
In 1901, Japanese government statistics recorded 30 people from British India living in Japan. There were 59 Indians living in the Hyōgo Prefecture in 1905, among whom all but one were men.

=== Imperial Japan ===
After the destruction wreaked on Yokohama in the 1923 Great Kantō earthquake, the Indian traders there migrated to Kobe. From then on, Kobe became the center of Japan's Indian community's growth. In 1939, on the eve of World War II, the number of Indians in Hyōgo Prefecture was 632. Due to British sanctions against Japan and the 1941 halt of shipping between Japan and India, many closed their shops and left. In 1942, there were 114 remaining.

=== Current era ===
Prior to 1990, the Indian community in Japan remained centred in the Kobe area. After 1990, the numbers in Tokyo began a sharp increase. Migrants who arrived in the 1990s included industrial trainees sent by Japanese car manufacturers which had set up factories in India. IT professionals and their families also came to Tokyo, settling primarily in Setagaya and Minato wards.

In 2021, Japan and India signed an agreement to allow Indian citizens to obtain the specified skilled visa, which allows Indians to work in fields including nursing, industrial machinery, shipbuilding, aviation, agriculture and the food services industry.

While strategic alignment remains the primary driver of India's popularity, cultural interest is also rising, with bilateral initiatives aiming to facilitate the exchange of 500,000 personnel over five years to deepen people-to-people ties.

== Business and employment ==
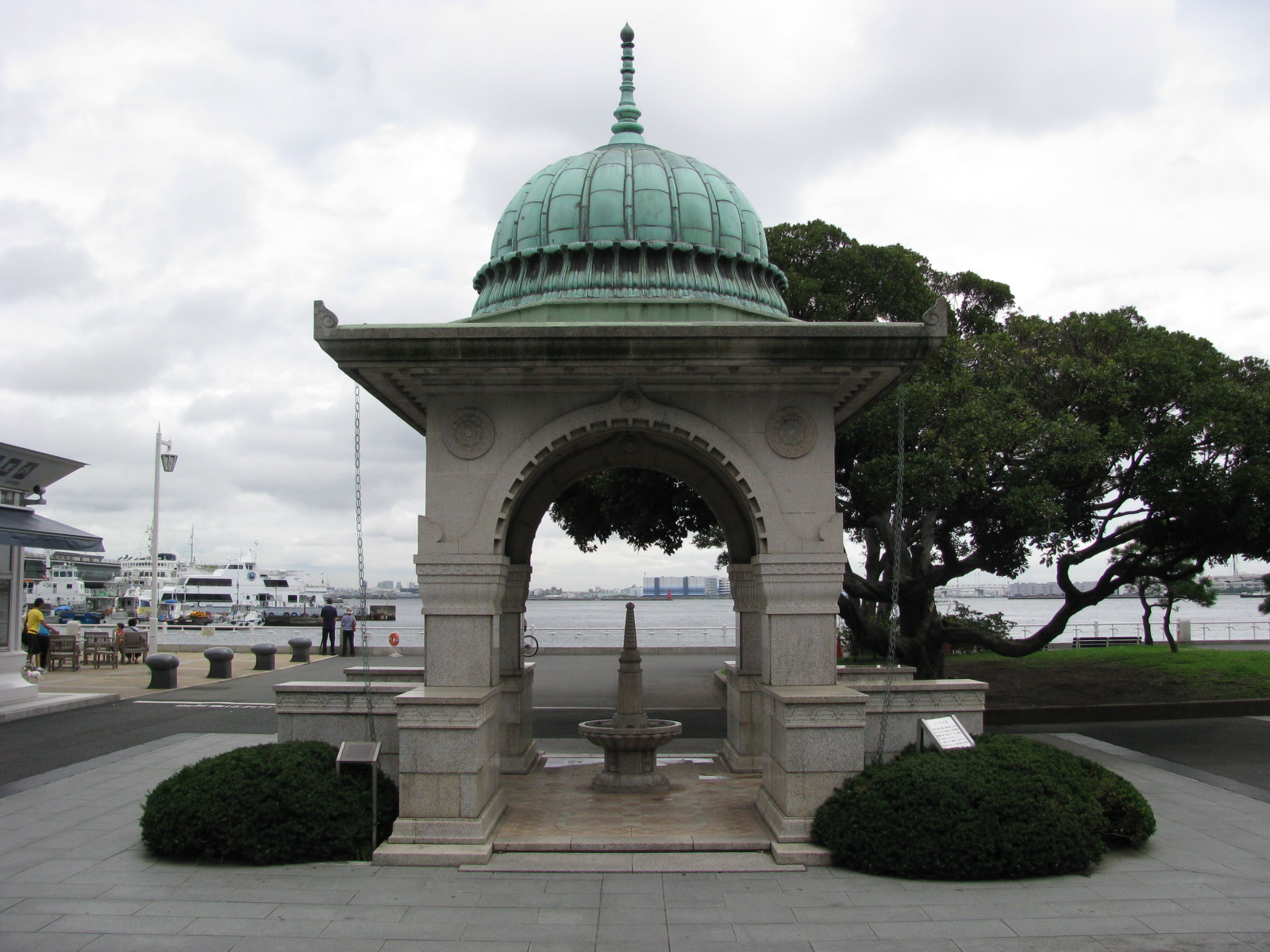
The Indian Water Fountain in Yamashita Park, Yokohama was donated by the local Indian community to remember those who perished in the 1923 Great Kanto Earthquake, including more than 90 Indians.

Indians in Japan largely fill more professional roles due to a combination of the language barrier and lower salaries for the specified skilled visa, for which there are only 434 Indians. There are far more students. The first batch of construction workers from India arrived in Japan in December 2019.

Japan has been increasingly looking to India as a source for IT workers and talent.

In 2023, Japan became a new destination for Indian nurses, with salaries over eight times higher than those found in India. Many Indian nurses in Japan come from the private sector because private hospitals in India often offer lower salaries than government hospitals.

== Communities ==
=== Tokyo ===
Indians in Tokyo are centered in the Edogawa, Tokyo. In 2018, there were 3,758 people of Indian ancestry, about 10% of the people of Indian origin in Japan and about 30% of the people of Indian origin in Tokyo Metropolis, in Edogawa. The Nishikasai area of Edogawa Ward has a high concentration of Indian origin families.

The Indian community especially increased when engineers came to Japan to fix the Y2K bug. Indian people settled in Nishikasai due to the proximity to the Tokyo Metro Tozai Line, which connects to their places of employment. India International School of Japan (IISJ) and Global Indian International School Tokyo caters to the Indian expatriate community.

=== Kobe ===
The Indian community in Kobe has developed primarily since the late 20th century, as professionals, traders, and business owners from India settled in the Kansai region. Kobe’s role as an international port city and its proximity to Osaka made it an attractive location for commerce, manufacturing, and information technology-related work. Over time, a small but stable Indian population emerged, supported by community organizations, cultural associations, and religious institutions, reflecting the broader pattern of Indian migration to western Japan.

== Cuisine ==
The majority of the Indian restaurants in Japan are a "fusion" of Nepali and Indian cuisine, who are by far the largest South Asian ethnic group in Japan, but many restaurants are also run by Indians.

== Religion ==
=== Jainism ===
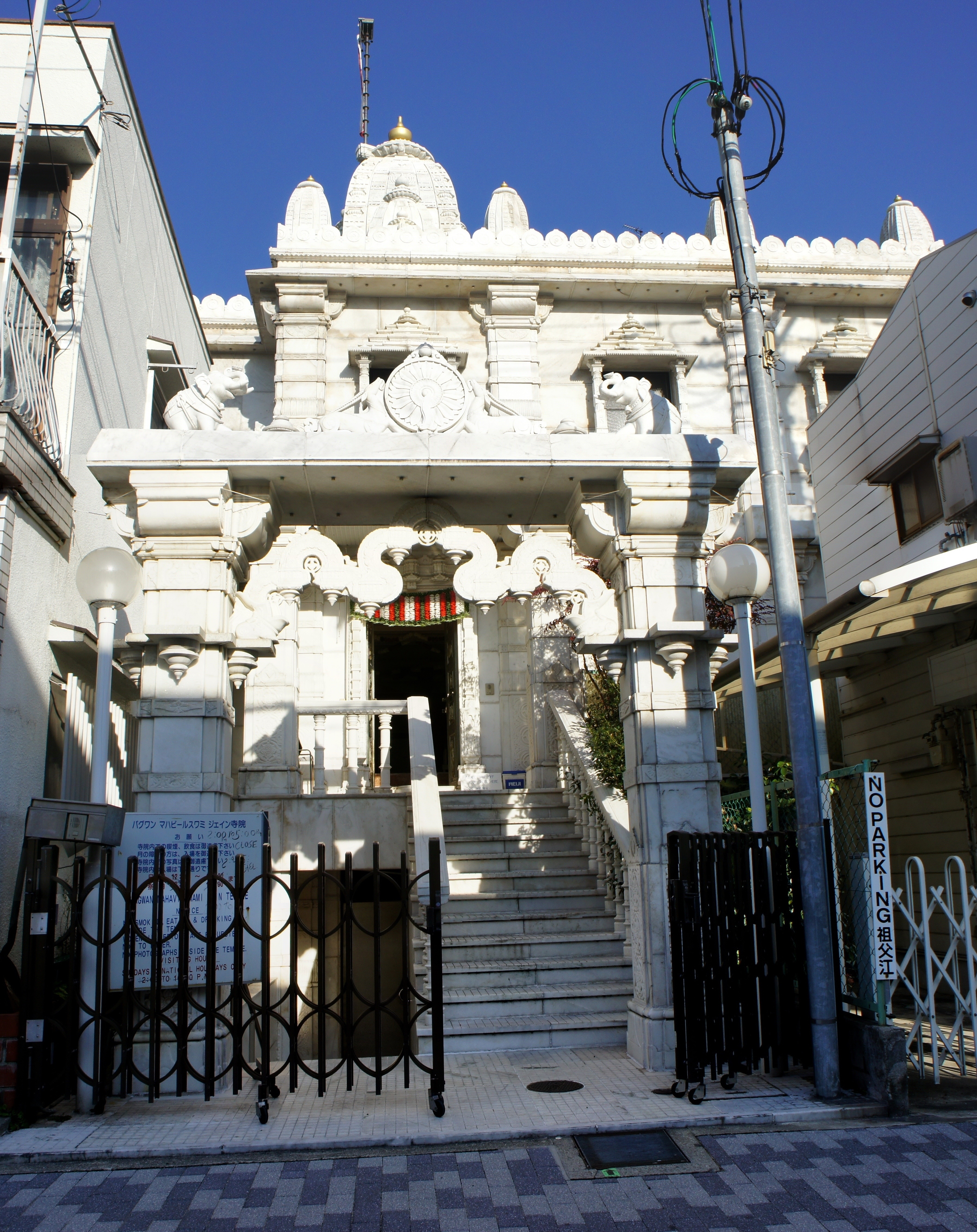
The Kobe Jain Temple

Indians in Japan speak a number of different languages and follow various religions; there is little correlation between religion or language and profession, except in the case of the Jains, many of whom work in the jewellery industry.

=== Sikhism ===
There are Sikh gurudwaras in both Kobe and Tokyo. The Tokyo one is more recent, founded in 1999 in the basement of an office building. Some Sikhs employed as unskilled labourers in small and medium enterprises had to cut their hair short and remove their turbans in violation of the principle of kesh, because their employers are unfamiliar with their customs and do not give them any latitude in their style of dress. They consider this as just a temporary adaptation to Japanese society. However, this practise is not common among Sikhs in skilled professions such as IT.

== Education ==
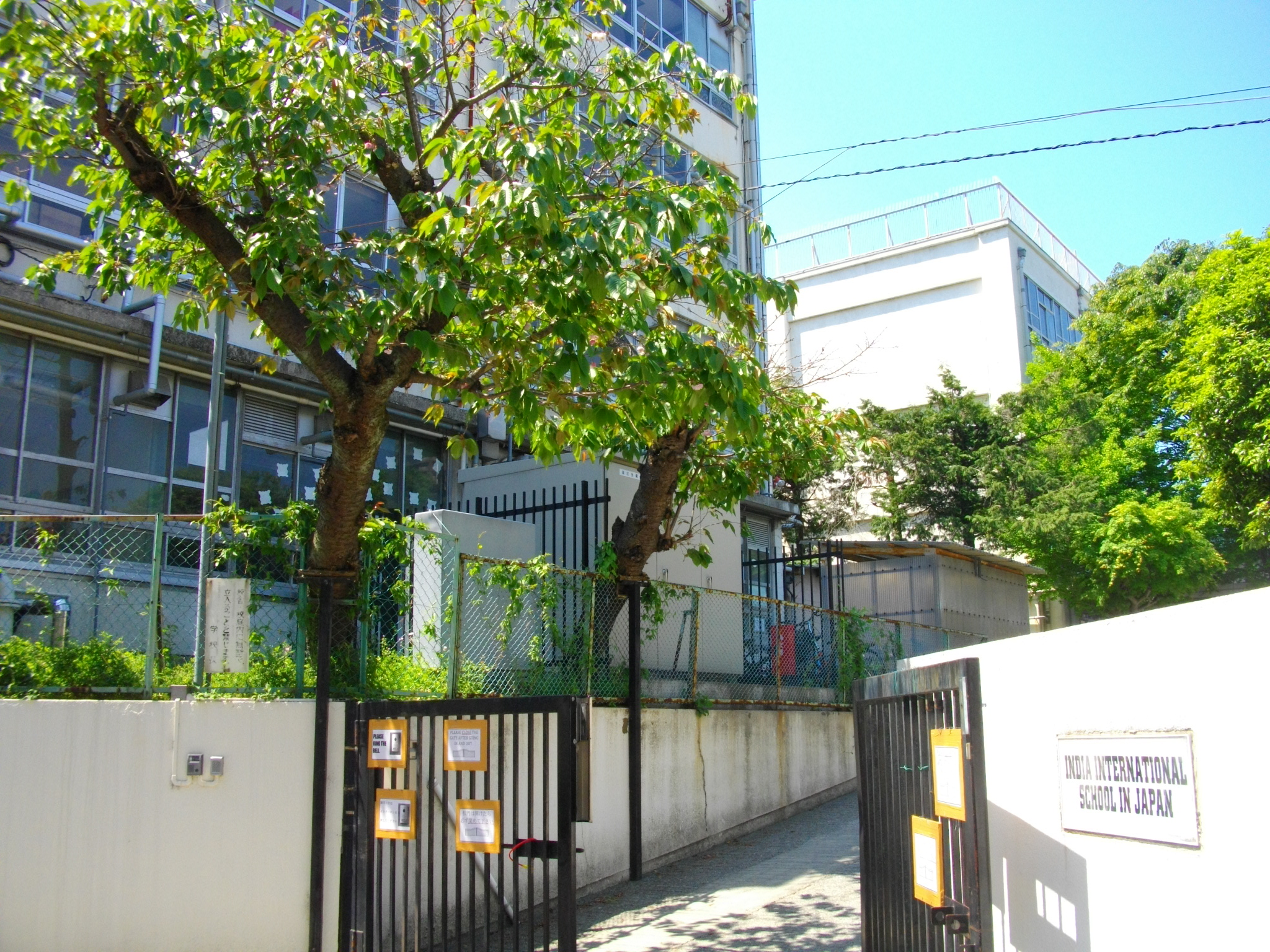
India International School in Japan, Tokyo

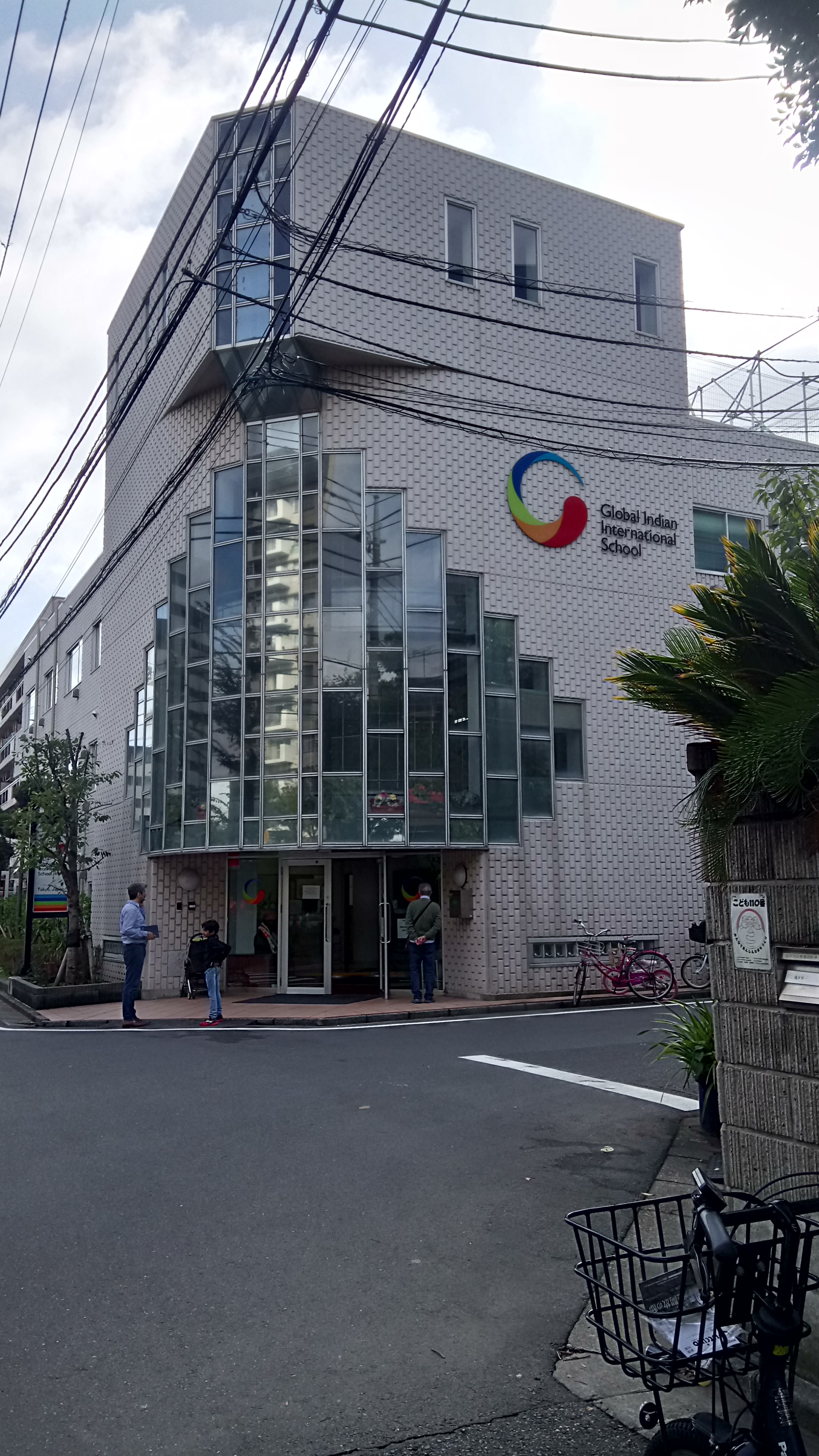
Global Indian International School, Tokyo Campus

The first Indian-specific school, India International School in Japan, was established in 2004 in Tokyo's Koto ward at the initiative of some of the old trading families based in Tokyo and Yokohama.

The Global Indian International School, a Singapore-based school, has operated a branch in Tokyo since 2006, and plans to open another in Yokohama in 2008. They follow the Indian Central Board of Secondary Education curriculum. Other migrants leave their children behind in their native states, either with grandparents or at the boarding schools, in order to avoid interrupting their education.

Jeevarani "Rani Sanku" Angelina established the Little Angels International School (now Musashi International School Tokyo), which caters to Japanese students.

== Community organizations and activists ==
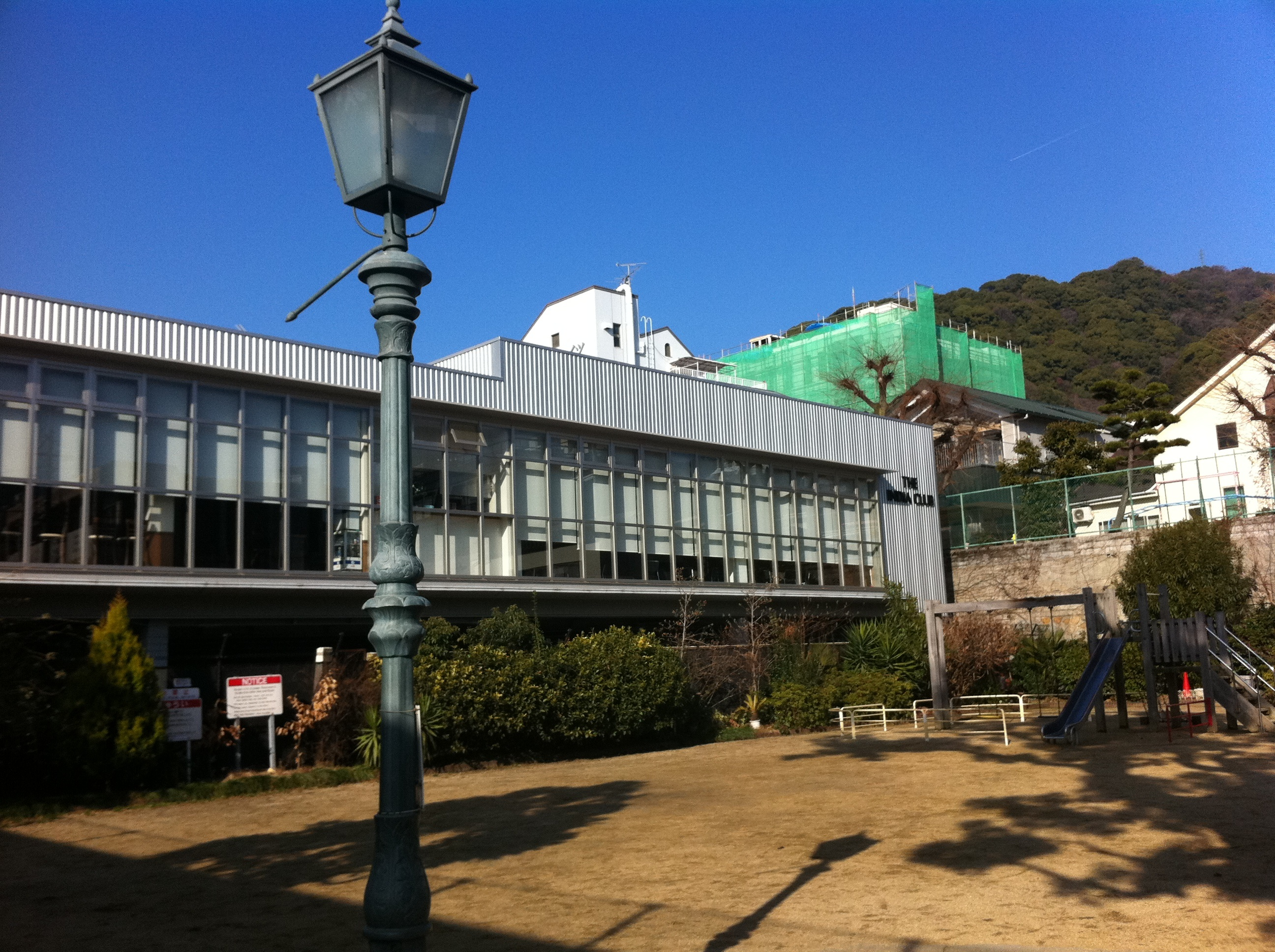
India Club in Kobe

In 1904, one of the earliest Indian community organisations, the Oriental Club, was established in Kobe. In 1913, it changed its name to The India Club, and continues operating up to the present day. More were founded in the 1930s, including the Indian-dominated Silk Merchants' Association, the Indian Social Society, and the Indian Chamber of Commerce. In 2000, Indian expatriates living in Edogawa, Tokyo, founded the Indian Community of Edogawa.

Jagmohan Chandrani, head of the Edogawa Indian Association, want to increase the amount of Indians in Japan in the future, and views Nishi-Kasai as a model for all neighbourhoods in the future. He says the future of Japan is cosmopolitan.

Lekh Juneja, is the chairman and CEO of Kameda Seika, and he advocates for increasing immigration to Japan. He criticise Japanese mindset and culture. He doesn't think it's enough that an employee only speaks or write Japanese.

Yogendra "Yogi" Puranik, the first person of Indian origin to be elected to office in Japan, says that Japanese people will have to change in order to adapt to an increasing number of foreigners.

== Other ==
=== Domestic violence ===
An article in the Japan Times complained that patriarchy perpetuates among Indian immigrants to Japan, whereas Indian women may feel more empowered in societies such as Berlin, Germany. Many Indian women to Japan rarely stay for career advancement, but rather prefer staying to become a housewife.

=== Illegal immigration ===
A number of people born in Japan to asylum seekers or illegal immigrants have reported being told to return to India.

Security tracking by the United Nations Office on Drugs and Crime (UNODC) and local border agencies reveals an operational shift where third-country nationals—primarily from neighboring South Asian countries facing stricter immigration barriers—exploit sophisticated syndicates to acquire genuine Indian identities via counterfeit domestic breeder documents like Aadhaar cards. This technique, known as "fraudulently obtained genuine passports" (FOGs), allows non-Indian impostors or look-alikes to masquerade under a nationality that generally commands lower scrutiny from the Immigration Services Agency of Japan.

=== Racism ===
There have been complaints about facing Islamophobia and racial profiling. Islam is considered a foreign culture within the framework of Japanese multiculturalism and is treated as such by most Japanese people. Large scale opposition to Muslim migration began in the 1990s, albeit targeting those from the Middle East, and Iranians and Pakistanis in particular.

In early 2024, an Indian, and a Black American and Pakistani, sued the Japanese government for racial discrimination; "There's a very strong image that 'foreigner' equals 'criminal'," Pakistan-born Syed Zain told Japanese reporters.

== Notable people ==
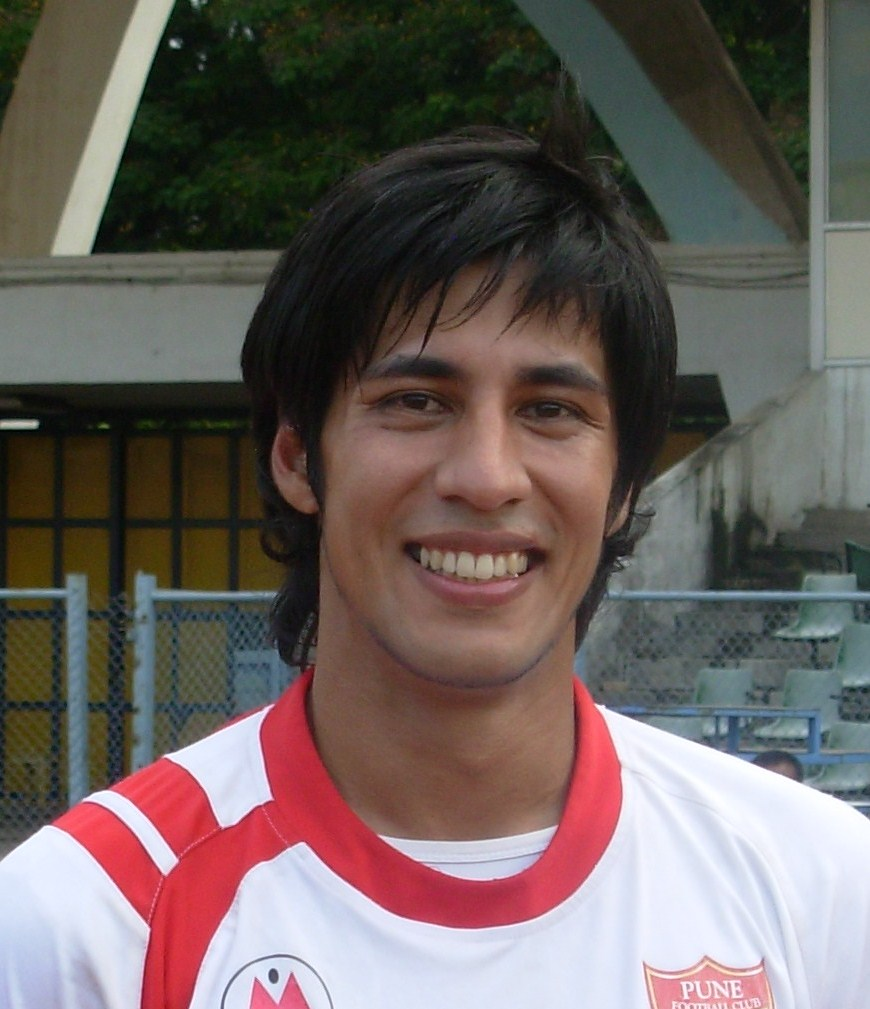
Arata Izumi

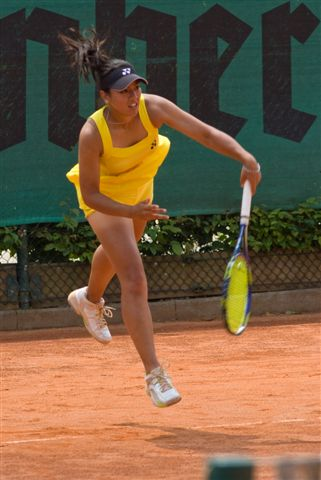
Anastasia Malhotra

- Anastasia Malhotra, professional tennis player (Indian-British/Greek-British father)
- Arata Izumi, football player (Indian father)
- Bodhisena, Buddhist scholar and monk
- Priyanka Yoshikawa, fashion model
- Sarbjit Singh Chadha, enka singer
- Yogendra Puranik, politician and civil services officer
- Ryuko Hira, investor
- Jaideep Singh, boxer
- Annu Mari, actress

== See also ==
Related diaspora groups:

- Indian diaspora
- Japanese people in India
- Nepalis in Japan
- Indians in Thailand
- Indians in Israel

Geopolitical topics:

- India–Japan relations
- Greater East Asia Co-Prosperity Sphere (Japan)
- Act East policy (India)
- Free and open Indo-Pacific ( Australia)
- Belt and Road Initiative (China)
- ASEAN–India Free Trade Area (ASEAN)
- Pivot to Asia (United States)
- Pacific century

Culture:

- Hinduism in Japan
- Buddhism in Japan

== Bibliography ==
- Azuma, Masako (2008), "Indians in Tokyo and its vicinity", in Kesavapany, K.; Mani, A.; Ramasamy, Palanisamy (eds.), Rising India and Indian communities in East Asia, Institute of Southeast Asian Studies, pp. 255–269, ISBN 978-981-230-799-6
- Minamino, Takeshi; Sawa, Munenori (2005), 在日インド人社会の変遷--定住地神戸を事例として [Changes in Indian society in Japan—focused on the case of Kobe residents] (PDF), 兵庫地理 (in Japanese), 50: 4–15, archived from the original (PDF) on 8 December 2015
- Sawa, Munenori; Minamino, Takeshi (2007), "Emerging of An Indian Community in Tokyo: A Case Study of Nishikasai" (PDF), The Indian Geographical Journal, 82 (1): 7–26, archived from the original (PDF) on 22 December 2021
- Singhvi, L. M. (2000), "Asia-Pacific Region" ( (PDF)), Report of the High Level Committee on the Indian Diaspora, New Delhi: Ministry of External Affairs, pp. 273–288, archived from the original on 6 February 2012
