= Musashi International School Tokyo =

Coordinates: 35.6879°N 139.5600°E

- ムサシインターナショナルスクールトウキョウ
- 9-7-14, Shimorenjaku, Mitaka-shi, Tokyo 181-0013, Japan

Information
- Former name: Little Angels International School and Academy
- School type: Private co-educational school
- Motto: Nothing is impossible.
- Established: 2002
- Head of school: Edward Gilbreath
- Grades: PreK-12
- Accreditation: Cambridge Assessment International Education
- Website: https://mist.school

Musashi International School Tokyo (MIST (Note: The school name in Japanese uses Latin characters)), formerly Little Angels International School and Academy (LAIS リトルエンジェルス・インターナショナルスクール; formerly リトルエンジェルス学園 Ritoru Enjerusu Gakuen), is an international school, kindergarten, English school, and adult business school with two campuses located in Mitaka, Tokyo, Japan.

It was designed to cater to Japanese children, whereas other Indian international schools in Japan were established mainly for Indian children.

== Composition ==
The school included Little Angels International School (LAIS; リトル・エンジェルス・インターナショナル・スクール) for full-time students and Little Angels English Academy (リトル・エンジェルス・イングリッシュ・アカデミー) for after-school classes. The Little Angels International School had four divisions: Little Angels International Kindergarten (リトル・エンジェルス幼稚園), the Little Angels International Elementary School (リトル・エンジェルス小学校), Little Angels International Middle School (リトル・エンジェルス中学校) and Little Angels High School (リトル・エンジェルス高等学校). The curriculum followed both Ministry of Education, Culture, Sports, Science and Technology (MEXT) guidelines and international English guidelines for education. The Little Angels Middle School and High School have received accreditation from the Cambridge International Examinations.

The school also offered special classes for adults, under the name Little Angels Business School (リトル・エンジェルス・ビジネス・スクール).

The Mitaka Main Campus (三鷹本校) had all levels of education, including the school, kindergarten, English academy, and business school. The Mitaka Station Campus (三鷹駅校) housed the Little Angels English Academy & International Kindergarten.

The school's original kindergarten campus in Mitaka was previously a single family residence. The school previously had a campus in Kichijōji, Musashino.

== History ==
Jeevarani Angelina, a native of Chennai, moved to Japan in 1990 and became a non-resident Indian. Angelina, who is known as "Rani Sanku" (Note: "Sanku" is the surname of Angelina's husband, Sarath Chandar Rao Sanku) due to the ease in pronouncing it in Japanese, established an English-training school, Little Angels English Academy, in 2002. The kindergarten was started in 2004. In the beginning, the school had an enrollment of only 5 students; This, however, increased to 15 students in 2005 and 30 students in 2006. By February 2008, enrollment had reached 85 students. Japanese student enrollment increased along with the general student enrollment. The school was scheduled to add the sixth grade in 2011. Melinda Joe of The Japan Times wrote that Little Angels "even helped pave the way for other Indian international schools in Tokyo, such as the Global Indian International School in Edogawa."

== Curriculum ==
Circa 2010 the school had incorporated aspects of Montessori education, with additional group work and a decreased emphasis on memorization. Students begin speaking English in public at ages 2 or 3, and at age 4 they were to only speak in English at school. Mathematics instruction began at age 2 and computer instruction began at age 3; these ages are younger than the respective ages at traditional Japanese schools. Other classes include arts and crafts, dance, and science. The school used Indian textbooks, but the school did not have Indian history classes. Conversation, games, and songs are part of the curriculum.

As of 2010, most students at this school and other Indian international schools who intended to study in the system until high school were aiming to enroll in universities outside Japan; the Tokyo Metropolitan Government considered this school and the other two Indian international schools in Tokyo to be "unauthorized schools" or schools which do not count as providing compulsory education under the School Education Law of Japan. A student who only attends "unauthorized schools" is ineligible to attend a university in Japan, unless they complete an accepted international curriculum such as the International Baccalaureate, or Cambridge International Examinations.

The school is currently undergoing evaluation by the Council of International Schools to provide opportunities for the graduates to enter Japanese and foreign universities.

== Student body ==
In 2008, it had 45 students, one of whom was Indian. Japanese people made up 80% of the students as of 2010. Children of mixed marriages and children from other countries make up the remainder. As of 2012, the percentage of Japanese students rose to almost 90%. As of 2015, the number of students rose to almost 90 students spanning from pre-school to middle school.

== Teaching staff ==
In 2008, there were four full-time teachers, three of whom were non-Japanese. As of 2008, the majority of the teachers started English early in their lives. These instructors originated from South Asia and Southeast Asia; including India, Indonesia, and Nepal. As of 2015, the school has teachers from Australia, England, Greece, India, Jamaica, Nepal, Philippines, the United States and have a diverse faculty.

== See also ==
- List of high schools in Tokyo
- Indians in Japan

Japanese schools in India:

- Japanese School of Mumbai
- Japanese School New Delhi
