= Genki Fujii =

Japanese political scientist

Genki Fujii (born 5 August 1952) is a Japanese political scientist.

== Early life ==
Fujii was born in Kitakoiwa, Edogawa, Tokyo. He graduated with a Bachelor of Arts from Waseda University, a Master of Arts from the Claremont Graduate University, and a Doctor of Philosophy at Harvard University.

== Career ==
Fujii sponsored the Conservative Political Action Conference in 2021.

Fujii ran a video on his YouTube channel promoting a conspiracy theory that the American FBI extrajudicially arrested and killed or disappeared several men, their wives, and children for their political affiliation in June 2021. He offered no evidence or references and claims two unnamed American journalists told him.
