= Aikoku Gakuen Junior College =

Private junior college in Japan

Coordinates: 35°44′22.7″N 139°52′52.3″E

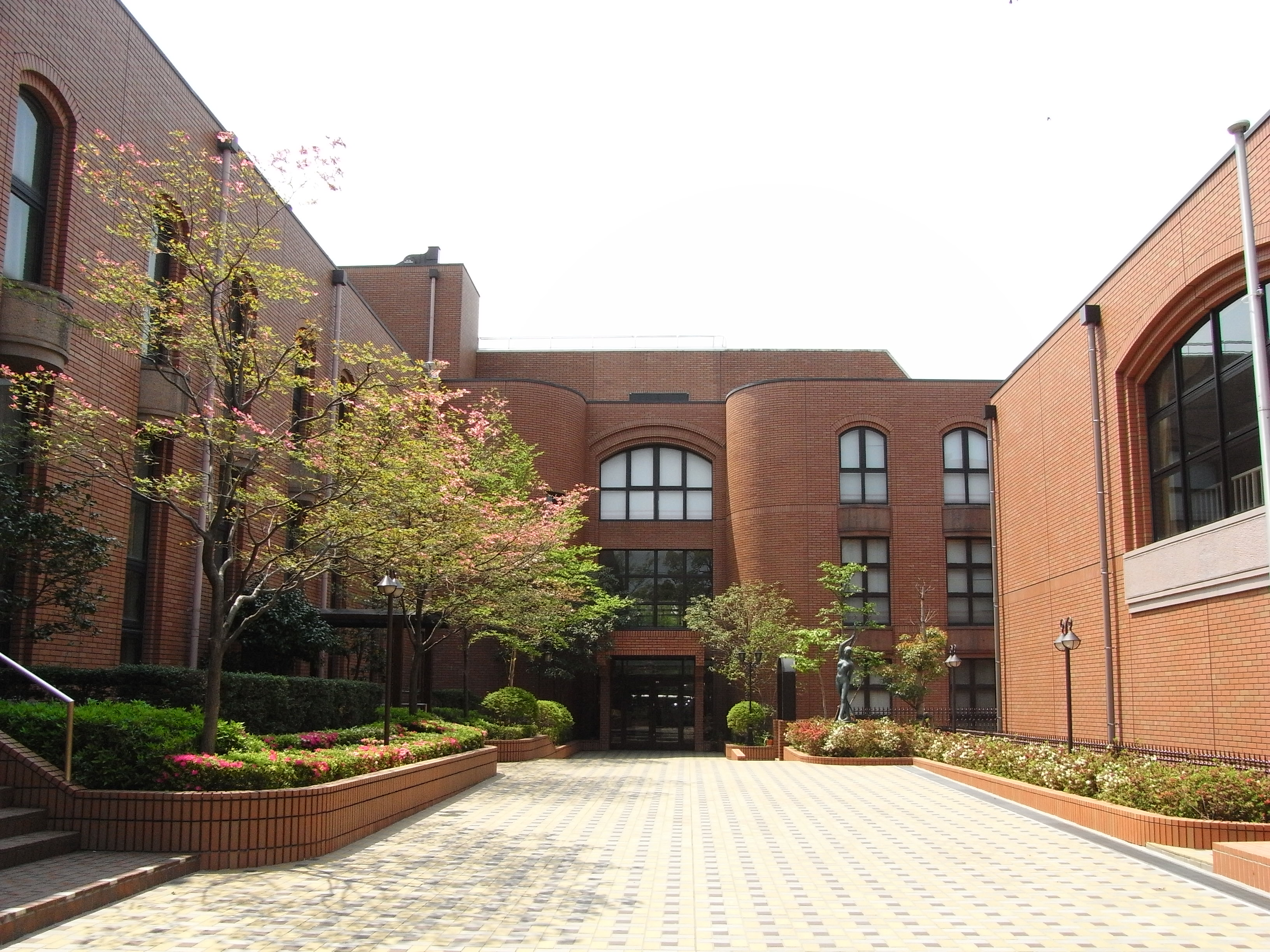
Aikoku Gakuen Junior College

Aikoku Gakuen Junior College (愛国学園短期大学, Aikoku gakuen tanki daigaku) is a private junior college in Edogawa, Tokyo, Japan. The precursor of the school was founded in 1938, and it was chartered as a university in 1962.

== Access ==
The campus is a quick 3-minute walk from Keisei Koiwa Station on the Keisei Main Line, about a 10-minute walk from Koiwa Station on the JR Sōbu Main Line, or about a 13-minute walk from Shin-Shibamata Station on the Hokusō Line.
