= IISJ =

IISJ may refer to:

- International Indian School Jeddah
- India International School in Japan
