= Global Indian International School, Pune =

International school in India

Location
- Pune; India
- 18.51126°N 73.94531°E

Information
- School type: Private
- Established: 2011
- Enrollment: 5000
- Average class size: 30
- Classes offered: Grades K-10 Year 2
- Language: English
- Slogan: Nurturing Future Citizens
- Accreditation: Central Board of Secondary Education, Global Montessori,
- Website: pune.globalindianschool.org

Global Indian International School (GIIS), Pune, is a Maharastra-based international school established in 2011.

== History ==
In 2011, the school was founded in Chinchwad. Subsequently, it relocated to two separate campuses, namely Hadapsar in central Pune and Balewadi. The previous campus is currently recognized as Elpro International School. During 2019, GIIS Pune commenced the implementation of SMART Campus facilities across its two campuses.

== Controversies ==
In 2018, the parents were compelled by the school management to purchase the Engineering for Kids (EFK) program, priced at ₹2,000, or else they would be denied textbooks altogether. As a result, parents staged a protest, and the mayor of Pimpri-Chinchwad had to intervene in the matter.

Earlier in the same year, the school faced another instance of protest when it made arbitrary decisions concerning fee payments. Parents were asked to pay an extra amount of ₹200 per day, including Sundays and holidays. Allegedly, the enrollment fee had been raised from 25 percent to 50 percent within a two-year period, as claimed by the parents.

In August 2019, as a result of a shift in management, the school underwent a name change from GIIS Pune to Elpro International School. This decision sparked demonstrations by a group of 100 parents at the school gates, seeking clarification regarding the unexpected removal of the school's brand identity. During that period, the Pimpri-Chinchwad Municipal Corporation administration sought clarification by issuing an official notice to the GIIS management, and they also requested documentation regarding the change of name.

== See also ==
- Global Indian International School, Singapore
- Global Indian International School, Tokyo Campus
