= Shinozaki Station =

Metro station in Tokyo, Japan

Coordinates: 35.705979°N 139.903741°E

Shinozaki Station 篠崎駅

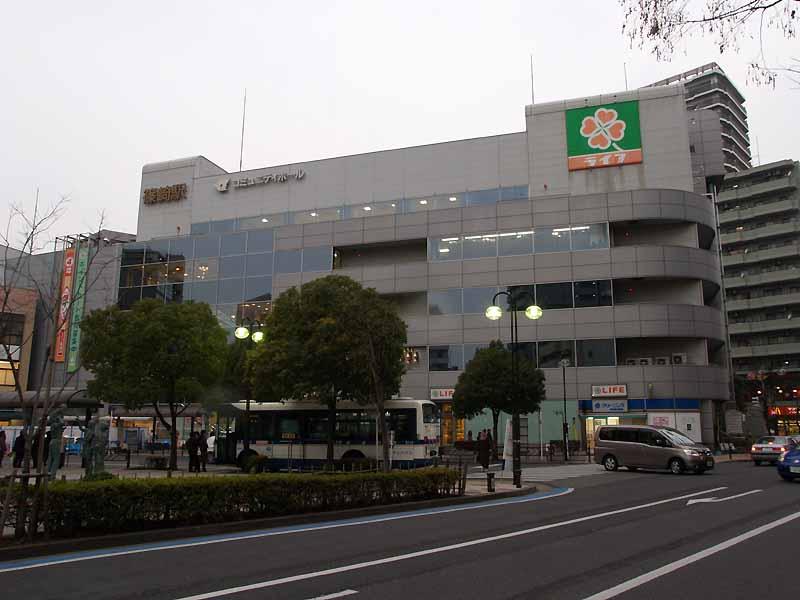
- Shinozaki Station building

General information
- Location: 7-27-1 Shinozaki-machi, Edogawa City, Tokyo （東京都篠崎町7-27-1） Japan
- Operator: Toei Subway
- Line: Shinjuku Line
- Platforms: 1 island platform
- Tracks: 2
- Connections: Bus terminal

Construction
- Structure type: Underground

Other information
- Station code: S-20

History
- Opened: 14 September 1986; 39 years ago

Passengers
- 32,343 daily

Services
Preceding station	Toei Subway	Following station
Mizue towards Shinjuku	Shinjuku Line Local	Motoyawata Terminus
Location
- Location within Special wards of Tokyo Location within Tokyo Bay and Bōsō Peninsula Location within Tokyo Location within Japan

Shinozaki Station (Japanese: 篠崎駅, Hepburn: Shinozaki-eki) is a railway station in Edogawa, Tokyo, Japan. Its station number is S-20. The station is the easternmost station in Tokyo. The station opened on 14 September 1986.

== Lines ==
Shinozaki Station is served by the Toei Shinjuku Line and is 20.7 km from the terminus at Shinjuku. Only local services stop at this station, except on the first Saturday in August, where express trains stop at this station to provide service to the Edogawa fireworks festival.

== Platforms ==
Shinozaki Station consists of a single island platform served by two tracks.

1	Shinjuku Line	for Bakuro-yokoyama, Shinjuku; Keio Line for Sasazuka, Hashimoto and Takaosanguchi
2	Shinjuku Line	for Motoyawata

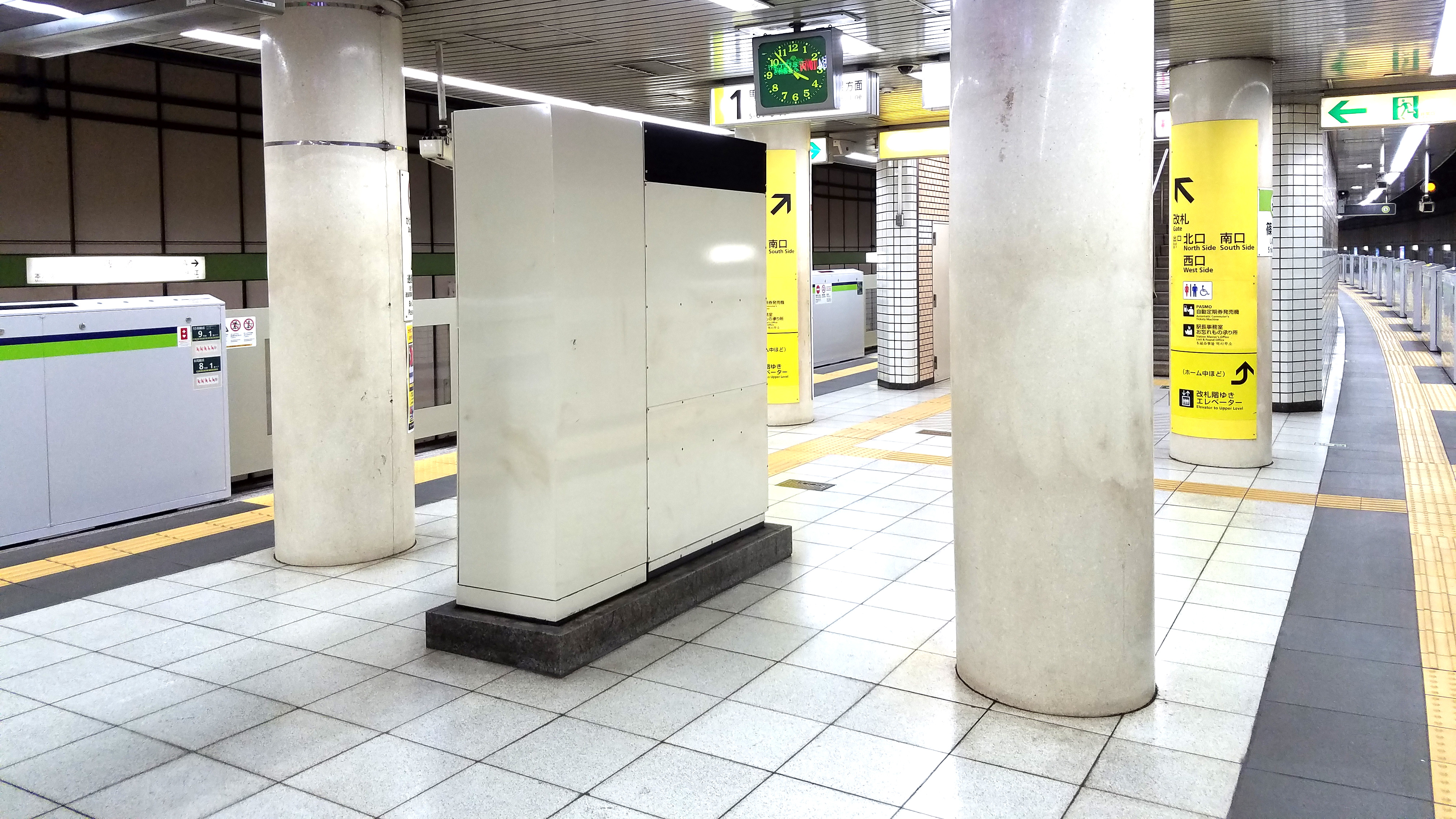
Platforms

== History ==
Shinozaki Station opened on 14 September 1986 as the terminus of the Toei Shinjuku Line. It became an intermediate station on 19 March 1989 when the extension to Motoyawata opened. The west gate (Twin Place side) of the station opened on 20 May 2008. Platform screen doors were brought into service on 19 May 2018.

== Surrounding area ==
The station is located underground just north of National Route 14 (Keiyō Road) and the Shuto Expressway's No. 7 Komatsugawa Line. Commercial and shopping facilities are clustered around the station, but the remainder is primarily residential. The Edogawa River is approximately 1 kilometer northeast. Other points of interest include:

- Edogawa Grounds
- Tokyo Metropolitan Shinozaki High School
- Edogawa Municipal Shinozaki Junior High School
- Edogawa Municipal Shinozaki 2nd Junior High School
- Edogawa Municipal Shinozaki Elementary School
- Kōtsu Kaikan Shinozaki Building
- Shinozaki Twin Place

== Connecting bus service ==
Keisei Bus: Shinozaki-Eki

- Shino 01: for Edogawa City Hall
- Shinko 71: for Shin-Koiwa Station, Mizue Station
- Ko 72: for Edogawa Sports Land, Koiwa Station

Toei Bus: Shinozaki-Ekimae

- Funa 28: for Funabori Station
