= GIIS =

GIIS is an abbreviation for:

- Global Indian International School, Singapore
- Graduate Institute of Development Studies, absorbed in 2008 into the Graduate Institute of International and Development Studies or Institut de hautes études internationales et du développement, in Geneva, Switzerland
