= Japanese people in Nepal =

Japanese people in Nepal ネパールの日本人 Nepāru no nipponjin
- (Japan) (Nepal)

Total population
- 1,107 (2016)

Regions with significant populations
- Kathmandu

Languages
- Nepali · Japanese

Religion
- Buddhism · Hinduism

Related ethnic groups
- Japanese diaspora

There is a small community of Japanese people in Nepal (ネパールの日本人, Nepāru no nipponjin), mainly comprising expatriates from Japan. As of 2016, there were about 1,107 Japanese nationals in Nepal.

== Overview ==
Many Japanese people live or work in the Thamel neighborhood of Kathmandu. The district hosts a Japanese street festival, showcasing Japanese cultural activities, food, and products, organized by Japanese local groups including the Japanese Thamel Association and JICA.

Many recent Japanese arrivals in Nepal are members of medical teams sent to provide surgeries for low-paid Nepalese communities. Most of the costs for medical equipment, supplies and medicines delivered by these teams were covered by charity contributions from Japanese people and companies.

== Education ==
The Kathmandu Japanese Supplementary School is a supplementary programme for Japanese children in Kathmandu.

== Notable people ==
- Takashi Miyahara (宮原巍) - Nepalese tourism entrepreneur and politician
- Noboru Iwamura (岩村昇) - Japanese Biologist
- Ekai Kawaguchi (河口慧海) - Japanese Buddhist monk
- Tow Ubukata (冲方 丁) - Japanese writer

== See also ==
- Japan-Nepal relations
- Nepalis in Japan
