= Japanese School of Mumbai =

Japanese international school in Mumbai

- ムンバイ日本人学校

Location
- Unit No. 201/202, Hiranandani Knowledge Park, Technology Street, Near Dr.L.H.Hiranandani-Hospital, Powai, Mumbai-400076.India; 19.1202428°N 72.91588060000004°E

Information
- Established: 1966
- Website: japanese-school-of-mumbai.jimdo.com

Japanese School of Mumbai (ムンバイ日本人学校, Munbai Nihonjin Gakkō), previously Bombay Japanese School (BJS) (ボンベイ日本人学校, Bonbei Nihonjin Gakkō), is a Japanese international school located in the Hiranandani Knowledge Park in Powai, Mumbai. The Japanese government funds the school, which is one of two Japanese international schools in India and serves a community of Japanese expatriates which numbered 270 in 2008.

== History ==
It was established under the statutes of the Japanese Ministry of Education and Science in 1966.

The school was at one time in Andheri East, and before that, in Worli.

The school adopted its current name on 1 April 2014 (Heisei 26).

== Campus ==
As of 2008 the campus has a media room, a common hall, a science laboratory, and seven air conditioned classrooms. As of 2008 there were 15 teachers, including 8 Japanese teachers and 7 Indian teachers. The subjects of geography, history, mathematics, and science are taught in Japanese, so the Japanese national teachers are responsible for those subjects. As of 2008 the number of students was 17. The school issues one laptop per student.

As of 2017, age of the school is 51 years old. Motto of this school is "grow big and become independent" (育てよ 大きく のびやかに). The name of this school's principal is Shoji Hashimoto (橋本 匠司 Hashimoto Shōji). The school has 13 teachers, including 4 native teachers, and 30 students. This is a small-scale school. This school's big events are BJS school Festival, Gulmohar Festival, and Sports Day.

== See also ==
- Japanese people in India

Indian schools in Japan:

- Global Indian International School, Tokyo Campus
- India International School in Japan
- Little Angels International School
