= Japanese School, New Delhi =

Japanese School New Delhi
- ニューデリー日本人学校

Location
- SECTOR-A, POCKET B&C, VASANT KUNJ, NEW DELHI, INDIA; 28°30′51″N 77°10′10″E

Information
- Established: September 1, 1964
- Website: ndjs.org

The Japanese School New Delhi (ニューデリー日本人学校, Nyū Derī Nihonjin Gakkō) is a Japanese international school in Vasant Kunj, Delhi.

== See also ==
- Japanese people in India

Indian schools in Japan:

- Global Indian International School, Tokyo Campus
- India International School in Japan
- Little Angels International School
