= Hinduism in Japan =

Hindus in Japan 日本のヒンズー教徒
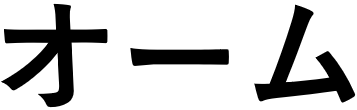
- The "Om" symbol in Katakana (Note: オーム (U+30AA & U+30FC & U+30E0))

Total population
- ▲380000 (0.3%) (2025)

Languages
- Liturgical: Sanskrit

Hinduism is a minority religion in Japan mainly followed by the Indian, Sri Lankan and Nepali expatriate residents of Japan, who number about 380,000 people as of end of 2025.

== History ==
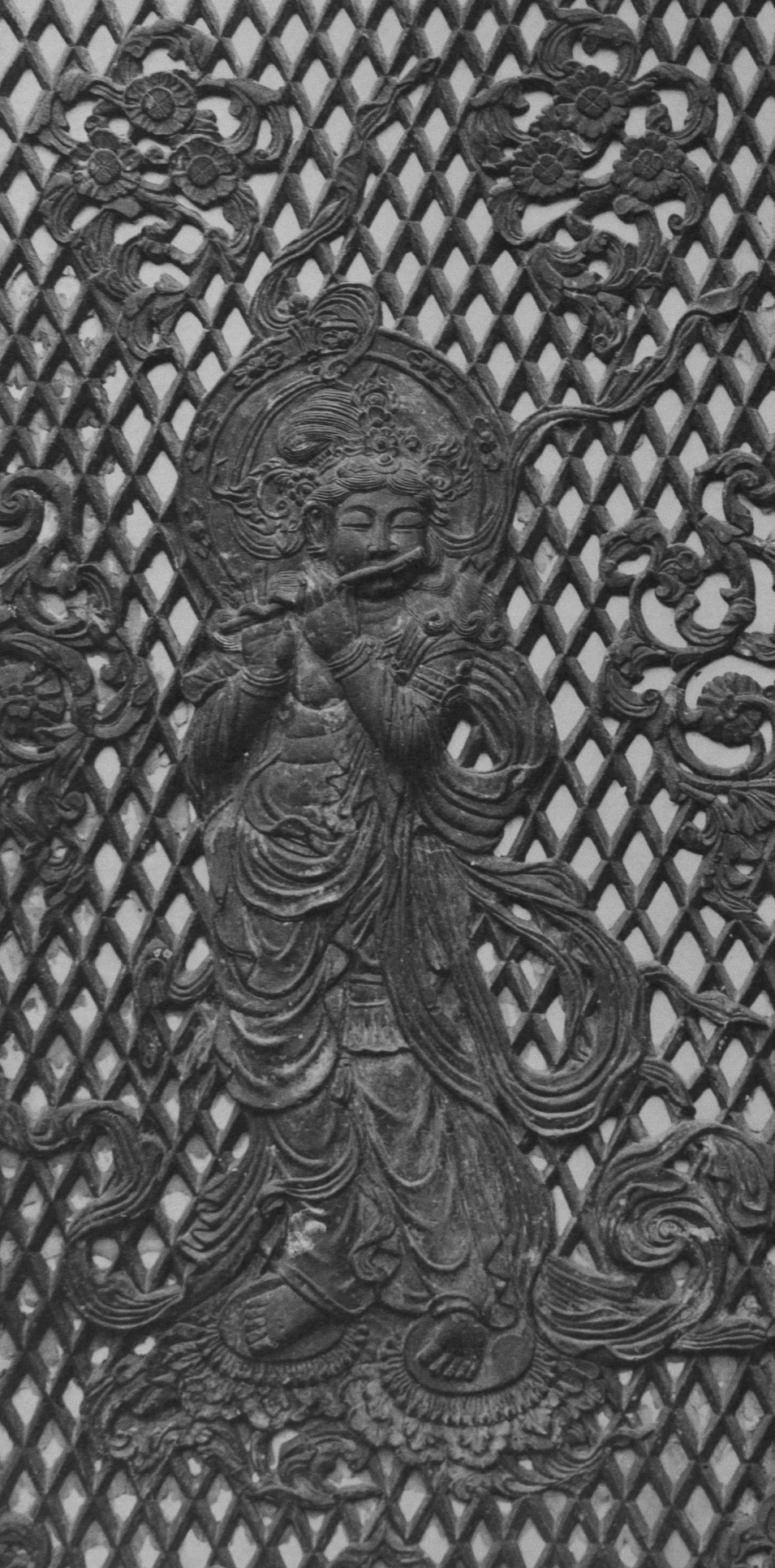
Depiction of Hindu deity Krishna playing the flute in a temple constructed in 752 CE on the order of Emperor Shomu, Todai-ji Temple, Great Buddha Hall in Nara, Japan

Hinduism diffused throughout East Asia via trade routes, and also through the expansion of Buddhism in the sixth century. There has also been significant transfer of Hindu-derived material native to China and South East Asia into Japan.

Hindu deities have been integrated into Japanese religious culture and several deities are worshiped for good luck. In fact there are many deities that are still worshiped in Japan which have long been forgotten in India.

Saraswati (Benzaiten) is arguably the most revered deity in Japan after the Buddha. She forms as a part of the "Seven Gods of Fortune", of which four originated as Hindu deities: Benzaitensama (Sarasvati), Bishamon (Vaiśravaṇa or Kubera), Daikokuten (Mahākāla or Shiva), and Kichijōten (Lakshmi). The last, along with Benzaitennyo (Saraswati) and the female version of Daikokuten completes the nipponized Tridevi of Great Goddesses.

The Hindu god of death, Yama, is known in his Buddhist form as Enma. Garuda, the mount (vahana) of Vishnu, is known as the Karura (迦楼羅), an enormous, fire-breathing creature in Japan. It has the body of a human and the face or beak of an eagle. Tennin originated from the apsaras.

Ganesha (or Kangiten) is prayed to for health, success and good fortune. Many Japanese Buddhist deities (or Tenbu) have their roots in Hinduism and are still revered by many Japanese particularly in Shingon Buddhism.

== Hindu philosophical and religious influence ==
Hindu traditions have had an influence on the Japanese religious culture.

Hindu-derived practices such as mantras, mandalas and fire rituals became important within Japanese Buddhism, mainly the Shingon and Tendai traditions. Scholars have noted the significant Indian elements preserved in Japanese religious practices, although these traditions were adapted within Japanese Buddhist and religious contexts rather than representing a direct relationship with Hinduism.

== List of Hindu gods in Japanese culture ==
Deities
English	Japanese	Thai-Brahmi	Devanagari-Sanskrit
Agni	火天	พระอัคนี	अग्नि
Ganesh	歓喜天	พระพิฆเนศวร	गणेश
Garuda	迦楼羅	ครุฑ	गरुड़
Lakshmi	吉祥天	พระลักษมี	लक्ष्मी
Virupak	広目天	ท้าววิรูปักษ์	विरूपाक्ष
Prithvi	地天	พระปฤถวี	पृथ्वी
Varuna	水天	พระพิรุณ	वरुण
Viruthak	増長天	ท้าววิรุฬหก	विरूढक
Dakini	荼枳尼天	ฑากิณี	डाकिणी
Mahakala	大黑天	มหากาฬ	महाकाल
Apsara	天人	อัปสร	अप्सरा
Sakr	帝釈天	ท้าวสักกะ	शक्र
Surya	日天	พระอาทิตย์	सूर्य
Brahma	梵天	พระพรหม	ब्रह्मा
Vaishravana	毘沙門天	ท้าวเวสวัณ	वैश्रवण
Saraswati	弁才天	พระสุรัสวดี	सरस्वती
Vayu	風天	พระพาย	वायु
Rahu	羅睺	พระราหู	राहु
Rakshassa	羅刹天	รากษส	राक्षस
Ishana	伊舎那天	พระอีศาน	ईशान
Skanda	韋駄天	พระเวทโพธิสัตว์	स्कन्द
Yama	閻魔天	พระยม	यम

== Present situation ==
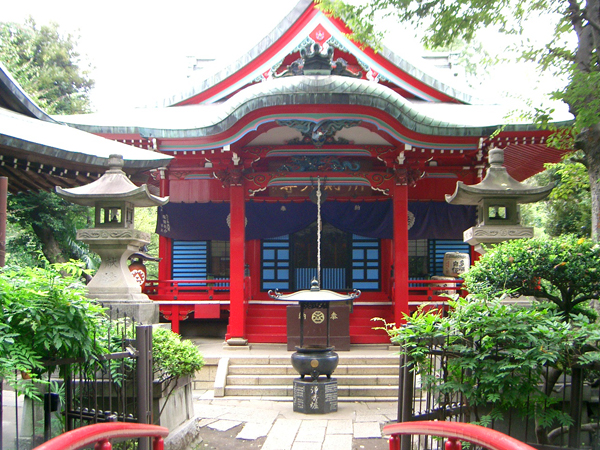
Benzaiten shrine, Inokashira Park

Hinduism is practiced mainly by Nepali, Indian and Sri Lankan migrants, although there are others. As of end of 2025, there are 79,128 Sri Lankans, 58,999 Indians and 300,992 Nepalis in Japan.

Hindu temples in Japan are as follows:

- Shirdi Saibaba Temple, Tokyo
- ISKCON New Gaya, Tokyo
- ISKCON Osaka Center, Osaka
- Vedanta Society of Japan, Kanagawa
- BAPS Shri Swaminarayan Mandir, Tokyo
- Shiva Shakti Mandir, Tokyo

The Association of Religion Data Archives estimated that 0.07% of the population of Japan were Hindu in 2020.
