= Mizue Station =

Metro station in Tokyo, Japan

Coordinates: 35.693314°N 139.897622°E

Mizue Station 瑞江駅

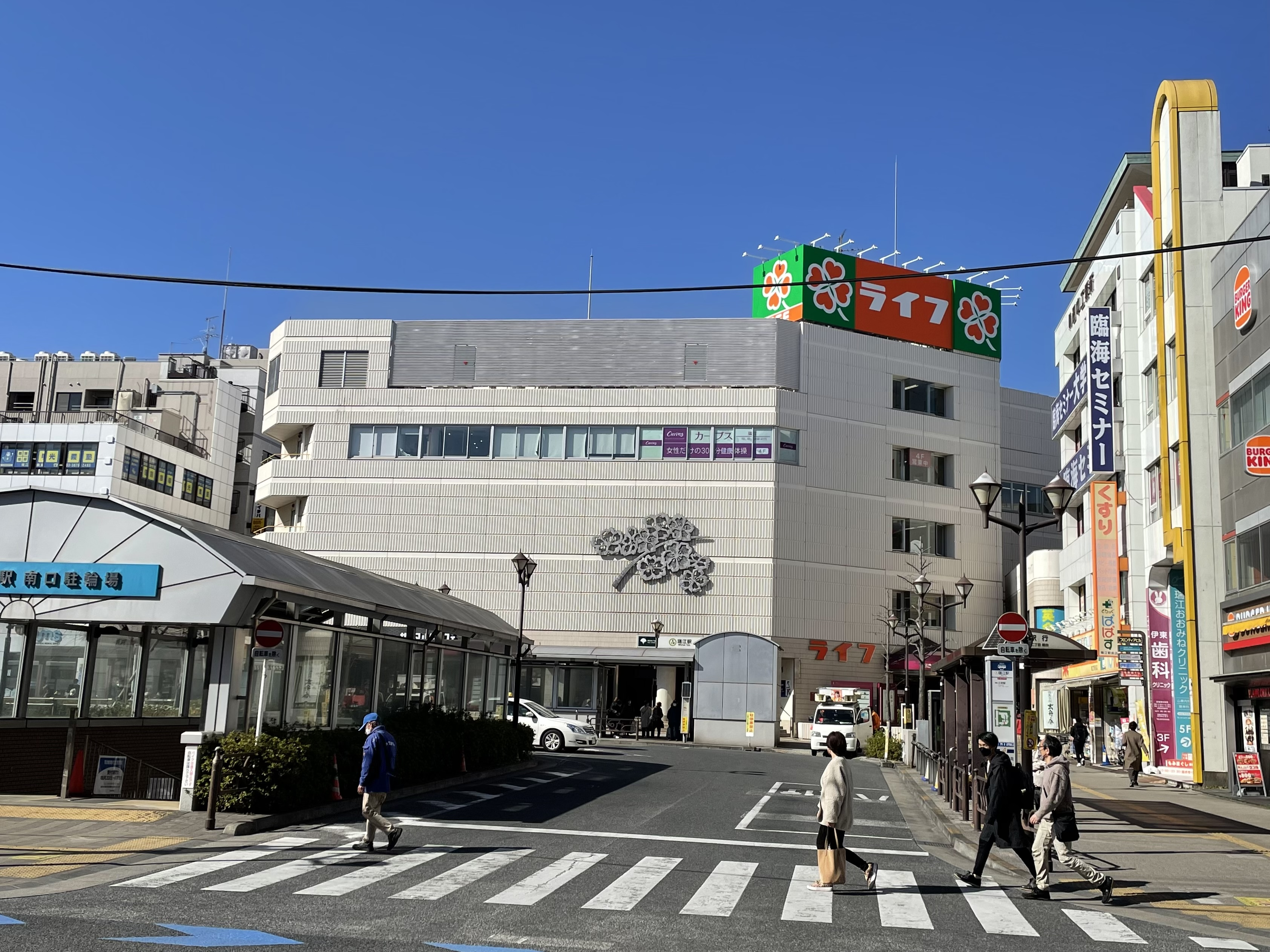
- South entrance to Mizue Station

General information
- Location: 2-2-1 Mizue, Edogawa City, Tokyo （東京都江戸川区瑞江2-2-1） Japan
- Operator: Toei Subway
- Line: Shinjuku Line
- Platforms: 1 island platform
- Tracks: 2
- Connections: Bus terminal

Construction
- Structure type: Underground

Other information
- Station code: S-19

History
- Opened: 14 September 1986; 39 years ago

Passengers
- 21,876 daily

Services
Preceding station	Toei Subway	Following station
Ichinoe towards Shinjuku	Shinjuku Line Local	Shinozaki towards Motoyawata
Location
- Location within Special wards of Tokyo Location within Tokyo Bay and Bōsō Peninsula Location within Tokyo Location within Japan

Mizue Station (瑞江駅, Mizue-eki) is a railway station in Edogawa City, Tokyo, Japan. Its station number is S-19. The station opened on 14 September 1986.

== History ==
- 14 September 1986 - The station opened.
- 18 March 2007 - Started to use IC cards "PASMO".
- 9 June 2018 - Started to use platform screen doors.

== Platforms ==
Mizue Station consists of a single island platform served by two tracks.

1
2
Shinjuku Line
Shinjuku Line
for Bakuro-yokoyama and Shinjuku

Keio Line for Sasazuka, Hashimoto and Takaosanguchi

for Motoyawata

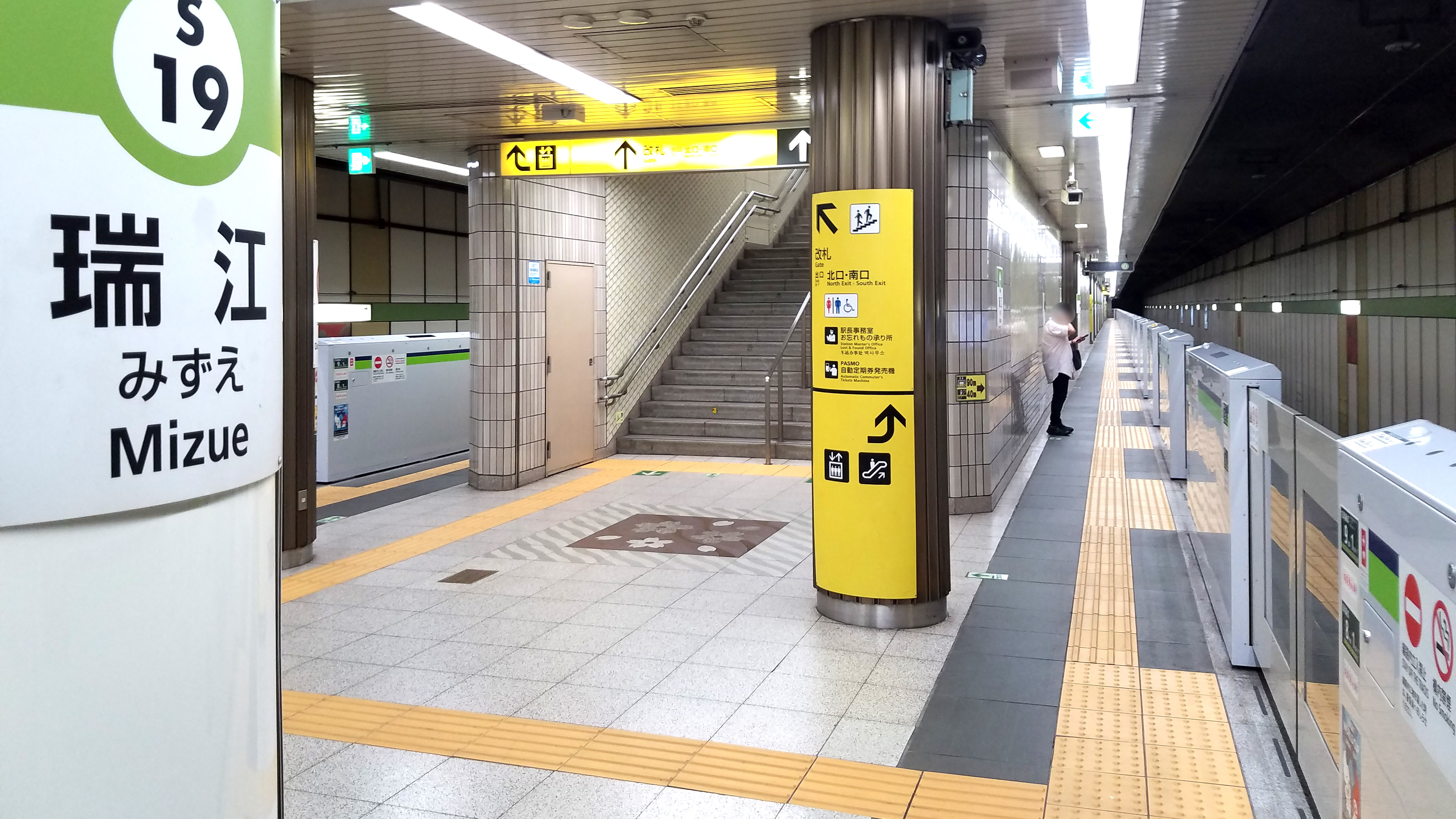
Platforms

== Surrounding area ==
The station is located underground in the middle of a residential area. Points of interest include:

- Tōbu Friend Hall
- Mizue Daiichi Hotel
- Tōbu Citizen's Hall
- Lapark Mizue (shopping center)

== Connecting bus service ==
Keisei Bus: Mizue-Eki

- Shinko 71: for Shin-Koiwa Station via Shinozaki Station
- Ko 72: for Koiwa Station via Edogawa Hospital
- Ko 73: for Koiwa Station, Edogawa Sports Land via Shinozaki-kaidō
- Ko 76: for Koiwa Station, Edogawa Sports Land via Shibamata-kaidō
- No Number: for Tokyo Rinkai hospital via Ichinoe Station and Kasai Station (To operate on weekdays and the second and forth Saturdays)
- No Number: for Icinoe Station (To operate on weekend)

== Line ==
- Tokyo Metropolitan Bureau of Transportation - Toei Shinjuku Line
