= Kitakoiwa =

Town located in Edogawa-ku, Tokyo

Coordinates: 35.742°N 139.890°E

Kitakoiwa 北小岩
- Town
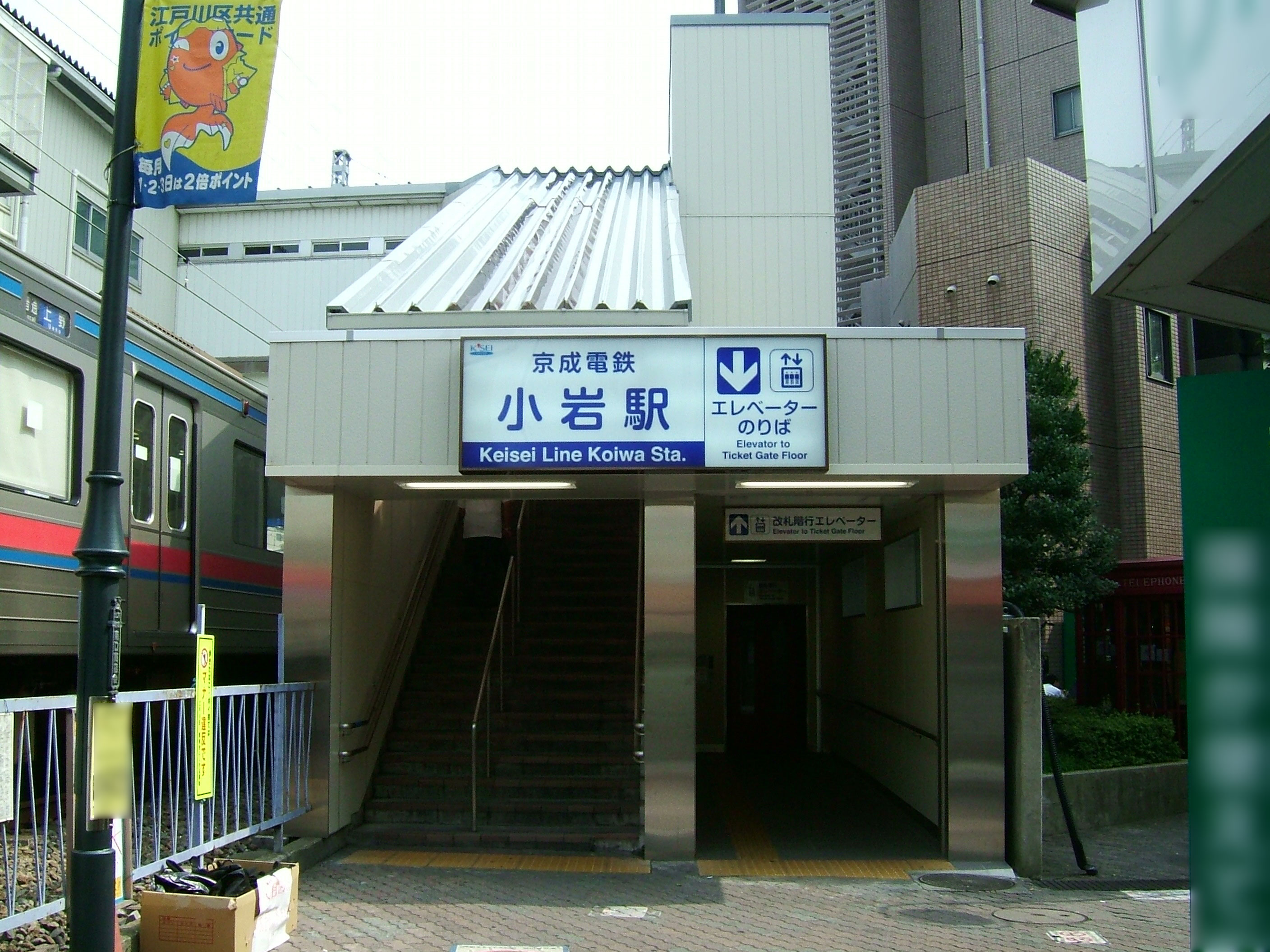
- Keisei Koiwa Station South Exit
- Interactive map of Kitakoiwa
- Country: Japan
- Region: Kantō
- Prefecture: Tokyo
- Special ward: Edogawa
- Neighborhood: Koiwa

Area
  - Total: 2.308 km^{2} (0.891 sq mi)

Population (2023)
  - Total: 29,295
  - Density: 12,690/km^{2} (32,870/sq mi)
- Postal code: 133-0051
- Area code: 03
- Vehicle registration: 足立

Kitakoiwa (北小岩) is a neighborhood in Edogawa, Tokyo.

== Demographics ==
The town has a population of 29,113 people.

== Education ==
Edogawa Board of Education operates public elementary and junior high schools.

The following elementary schools serve portions of Kitaoiwa: Kita-Koiwa (北小岩小学校), Nakakoiwa (中小岩小学校), Kamikoiwa (上小岩小学校), and Kamikoiwa No. 2 (上小岩第二小学校). All residents are zoned to Koiwa No. 3 Junior High School (江戸川区立小岩第三中学校).

There are four elementary schools.

== Popular culture ==
Kitakoiwa was discussed during the 2016 film Rudolf the Black Cat.

== Notable people ==
- Genki Fujii, political scientist
