= Nepalis in Japan =

Nepali diaspora in Japan

在日ネパール人 जापानमा रहेका नेपालीहरु

Total population
- 300,992 (In December, 2025)

Regions with significant populations
- Tokyo (Shinjuku) · Ōsaka · Aichi · Hamamatsu · Fukuoka · Naha · Yokohama · Sapporo · Kawasaki · Sagamihara · Chiba · Funabashi · Saitama · Kawaguchi

Languages
- Nepali · Japanese · Maithili · Newari · Magar

Religion
- Hinduism (majority) · Buddhism · Kirat Mundhum

Related ethnic groups
- Nepali diaspora, Indians in Japan, Bangladeshis in Japan, Burmese people in Japan

Nepalis in Japan consist of migrants from Nepal to Japan, including temporary expatriates and permanent residents, as well as their locally born descendants. In December 2025, there are about 300,992, Nepalis living in Japan, which makes them the largest South Asian community in the country.

Nepalis are the second largest foreign student community in Japan. The country remains a dream destination for many Nepali youth, with many paying over $14,000 to enter the country on a student visa.

== Employment ==
Japan was a popular destination for Nepalese immigrants, as they could earn five times more than the average wage in Nepal, even in low-skilled manual jobs in the service sector.

== Demographics ==
The largest concentration of Nepalis in Japan is in Tokyo, especially in the Shinjuku special ward, home to 3,838 Nepali citizens, or 1.1% of the ward's population in 2024. As of In December 2025, Tokyo had a Nepali population of 63,710. Other wards and neighborhoods with a large Nepali population include Nishi-Kasai, known as Tokyo's Little India with a large population of Indian and Nepali citizens.

The prefectures with the most Nepali citizens in Japan as of December, 2025 are Tokyo with 63,710 Nepalis, Osaka with 27,813, Chiba with 26,348, Aichi with 23,328, Fukuoka with 22,037, Saitama with 20,657, Kanagawa with 19,554, Hyōgo with 11,411, Shizuoka with 7,524, and Gunma with 7,355. Nepalis are the largest group of foreign workers in Okinawa, making up 24.6% of foreign workers employed in the prefecture.

== See also ==
- Japan–Nepal relations
- Japanese people in Nepal
- Ethnic groups of Japan
