= India International School in Japan =

International school in Japan

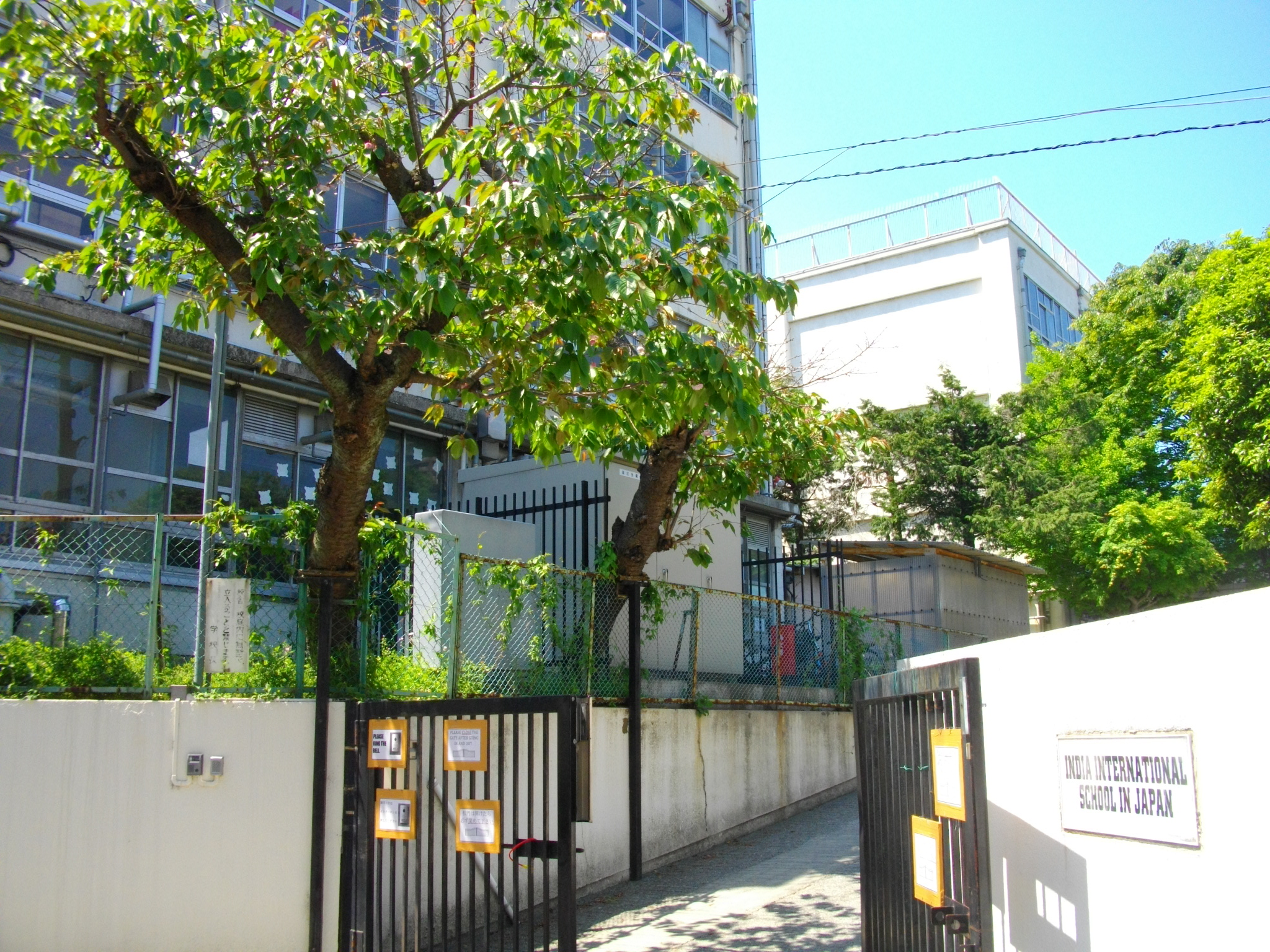
India International School in Japan, Tokyo

The India International School in Japan (IISJ, インド系インターナショナルスクール) is an Indian education international school in the Kanto region of Japan. It has one campus in Koto, Tokyo and one campus in Midori-ku, Yokohama. It is a K-12 school ranging from elementary to senior secondary.

The school first opened in the year of 2004. It moved into its current Tokyo facility in April 2007; this building has four stories. At that time it served grade levels kindergarten throughi 10. As of 2008 the school was expanding in size. Its current campus is a former Japanese elementary school in Koto-ku and a building that had been rented circa 2018.

== Student body ==
As of 2018, the Tokyo Campus of IISJ has more than 1000 students with children from various nationalities i.e. Japan, Pakistan, and India.

As of September 2007 there were over 200 students, including 7 Japanese. As of late 2007 there were 10 Japanese students and 160 students of other nationalities.

== Curriculum ==
As of 2007 in the first grade students begin public speaking, acting, computer programming, and debate. English is the educational medium of classes. Its curriculum is based on standards set by the Central Board of Secondary Education (CBSE) in India.

Hindi, however, is not the only language available as a student may choose one from a variety of Tamil (native teacher), Nepali (native), French (Parisian), Japanese (native).

The school not only emphasizes academics but also physical education. Students may participate in co-curricular activities for an additional fee. The school has three laboratories; two science labs and a retro-computer lab with windows software and more than 50 seats and computers.

== Campus move ==
In spring 2023, the Tokyo campus of IISJ Moved to the new building in the Toyo, Koto, Tokyo. The current president is Nirmal Jain.

== See also ==
- Indians in Japan

Japanese schools in India:

- Japanese School of Mumbai
- Japanese School New Delhi
