= Yogendra Puranik =

Japanese politician (born 1977)

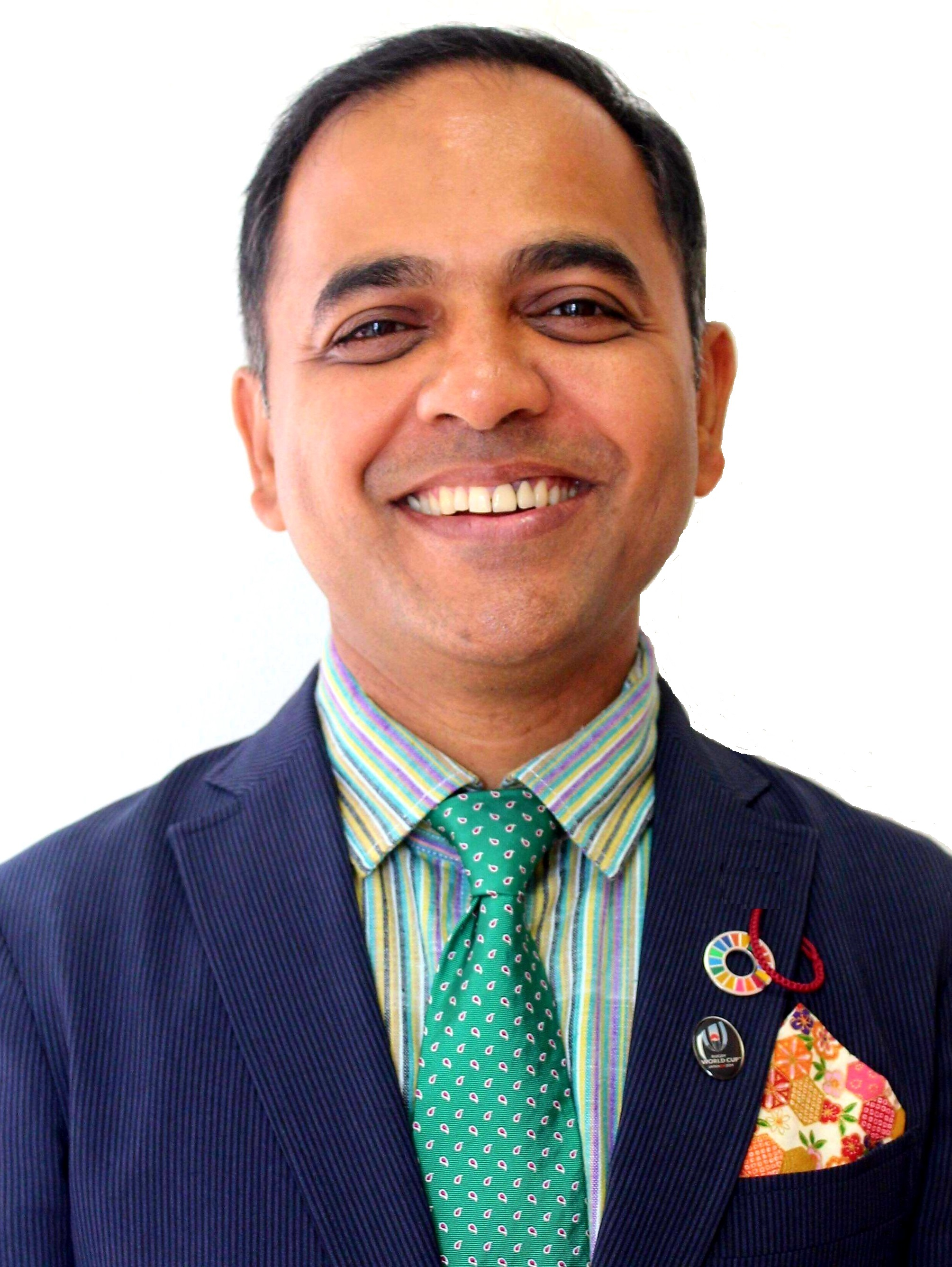
- Puranik in September 2019

Member of the Edogawa City Council
- Incumbent
- Assumed office 2 May 2019

Personal details
- Born: 3 June 1977 (age 49) Ambarnath, Maharashtra, India
- Party: Constitutional Democratic
- Education: Savitribai Phule Pune University; Indian Institute of Management Calcutta

Yogendra Puranik (Japanese: プラニク ヨゲンドラ Puraniku Yogendora, Marathi: योगेंद्र पुराणिक; born 3 June 1977) is an Indian-born Japanese politician and the first person of Indian origin to win an election in Japan. He was elected to the Tokyo's Edogawa City assembly as City Councillor in April 2019. He was supported by the Constitutional Democratic Party of Japan.

In April 2022, Puranik was appointed as the Principal of Tsuchiura First High School in the Ibraraki prefecture.

== Early life ==
Puranik was born in Ambarnath, Mumbai, India, on 3 June 1977 to his parents Rekha and Sharad Puranik.

Puranik started his schooling at Kendriya Vidyalaya in Ambarnath. He graduated from Sir Parashurambhau College under the Pune University with a Bachelor of Science degree with specializations in physics and mathematics. He also joined the Foreign Languages Department of the Ranade Institute of to study Japanese and German languages. He graduated with a diploma in information technology in May 1996 and an advanced diploma in Japanese language in May 1997.

== Life in Japan ==
Puranic worked with multiple IT companies in India before moving to Japan in 2001. In Japan, he worked for the information technology companies Infosys Technologies Limited, Fujifilm, and Polaris Software Lab Limited before joining the Mizuho Bank in 2010 and later at Rakuten Bank in corporate planning before moving to a political career. Puranik started an Indian restaurant Reka in Tokyo in February 2013 in Japan.

== Political career ==
Puranik announced his candidacy in the regional elections that took place in April 2019 in Japan. He is currently a member of the Constitutional Democratic Party, the largest opposition party in Japan.

Puranik unsuccessfully contested in the Tokyo Metropolitan Assembly in the 2021 election, finishing in 7th place out of 8 candidates, with 9.3% (20,109) of the vote.

== See also ==
- List of naturalized Japanese politicians
