= Japan–Nepal relations =

- Japan: Nepal

Japan–Nepal relations are bilateral relations between Japan and the Federal Democratic Republic of Nepal. Diplomatic relations between the two countries were established on 28 September 1956. Japan has an embassy in Kathmandu, and Nepal has an embassy in Tokyo.

== History ==
Although formal relations were established in 1956, the cultural ties between Nepal and Japan date back to direct people-to-people contact started in 1899.

== Japanese assistance ==
Much of the aid to Nepal is delivered in cooperation with the Asian Development Bank. Japan is one of the largest aid donors to Nepal. As of May 2009, Japan has provided the following level of financial assistance and donations to Nepal:

- Loans: 58.4 billion yen
- Grants: 13.6 billion yen
- Technical Cooperation: 42.6 billion yen

Examples of Japanese assistance include:

- In 2001 Japan offered a loan of up to 5,494 million yen for the construction of the Mahankal-Melamchi water treatment plant for Kathmandu.
- In 2004, Japan committed a loan of US$160 million (50% of total foreign assistance to the project) for Nepal's biggest hydroelectric project called Kaligandaki 'A'
- In 2004, Japan agreed to write off a loan of about $200m to Nepal, which was used to fund development projects. The money was to be diverted to poverty alleviation schemes.
- In 2007, in cooperation with the Asian Development Bank and the Dutch Government, Japan provided US$600,000 to develop the water supply and sanitation sector in small towns in Nepal.
- In 2008, Japan granted US$750,000 to assist Nepal in preparing a project design to improve the quality of air transport services.

=== Defence ===
In 2007, Japan sent self-defence troops to Nepal as part of a United Nations mission to help implement a peace agreement.

== Diasporas ==
=== Nepalis in Japan ===
As of June 2024, there are about 206,898 Nepalis living in Japan, which makes them the largest South Asian community in the country.

=== Japanese people in Nepal ===
As of 2016, there were over 1,000 Japanese people living in Nepal – mainly expatriates.

== See also ==
- Foreign relations of Japan
- Foreign relations of Nepal
