= Global Indian International School, Singapore =

Global Indian International School Singapore
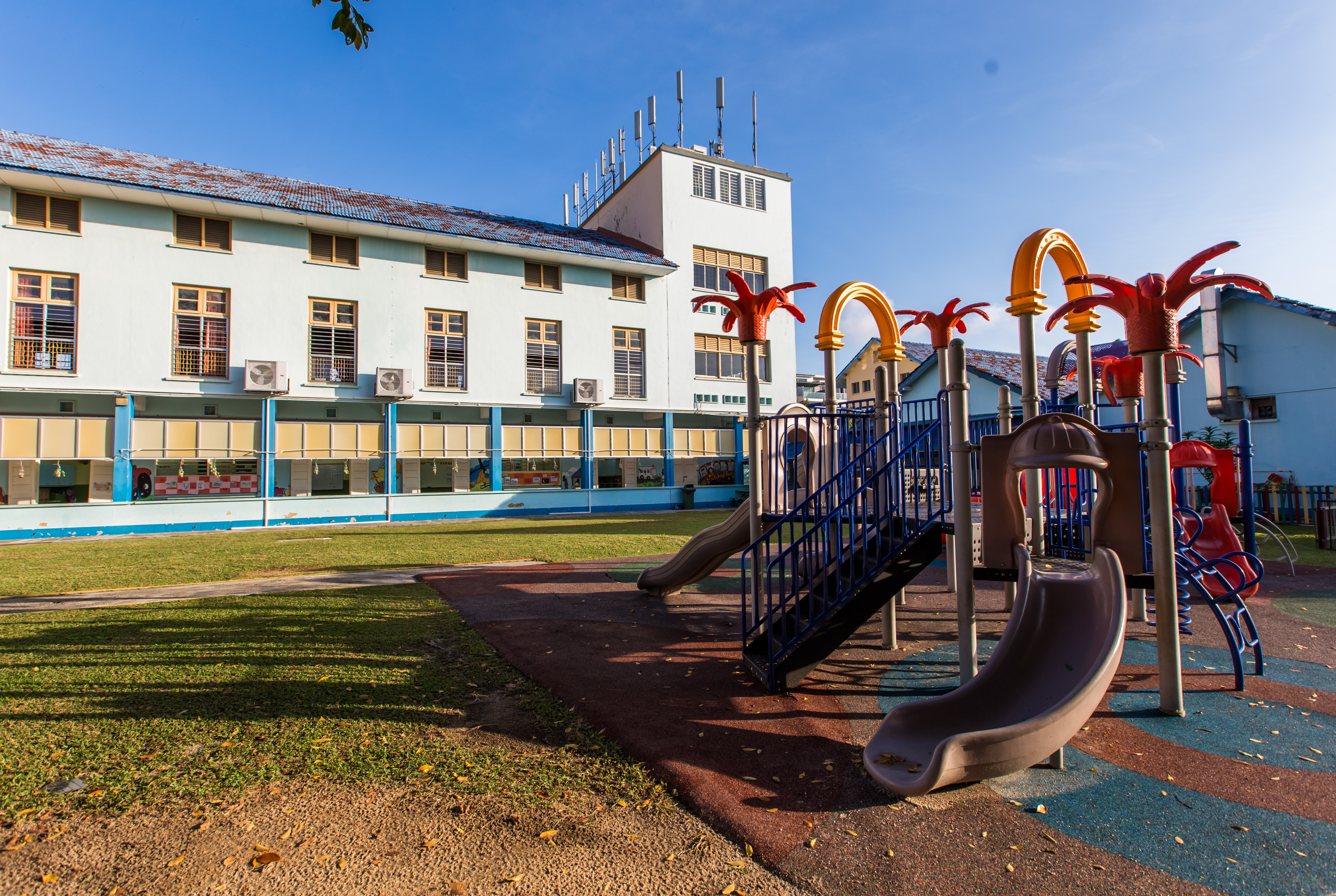
- East Coast Campus (2020)

Location
- East Coast: 82 Cheviot Hill; Singapore 459663; SMART: 27 Punggol Field Walk; Singapore 828649; Singapore; 1.3902°N 103.9117°E

Information
- School type: Private International School
- Established: 2002; 24 years ago
- Chairman: Mr. Atul Temurnikar
- SMART Campus Principal: Ms. Deepika Sodhi
- Faculty: 200 academic; 70 admin (2019)
- Enrollment: ≈ 4,000
- Average class size: 30
- Education system: GMP, IB PYP, CBSE, Cambridge IGCSE, CLSP, IBDP
- Classes offered: Grades KG-12
- Language: English, Hindi, Tamil, French, Mandarin and Spanish
- Campus: SMART Campus, East Coast Campus
- Slogan: Nurturing Future Citizens
- Accreditation: IB Diploma Programme, University of Cambridge IGCSE, Central Board of Secondary Education, EduTrust Singapore
- Website: https://singapore.globalindianschool.org/

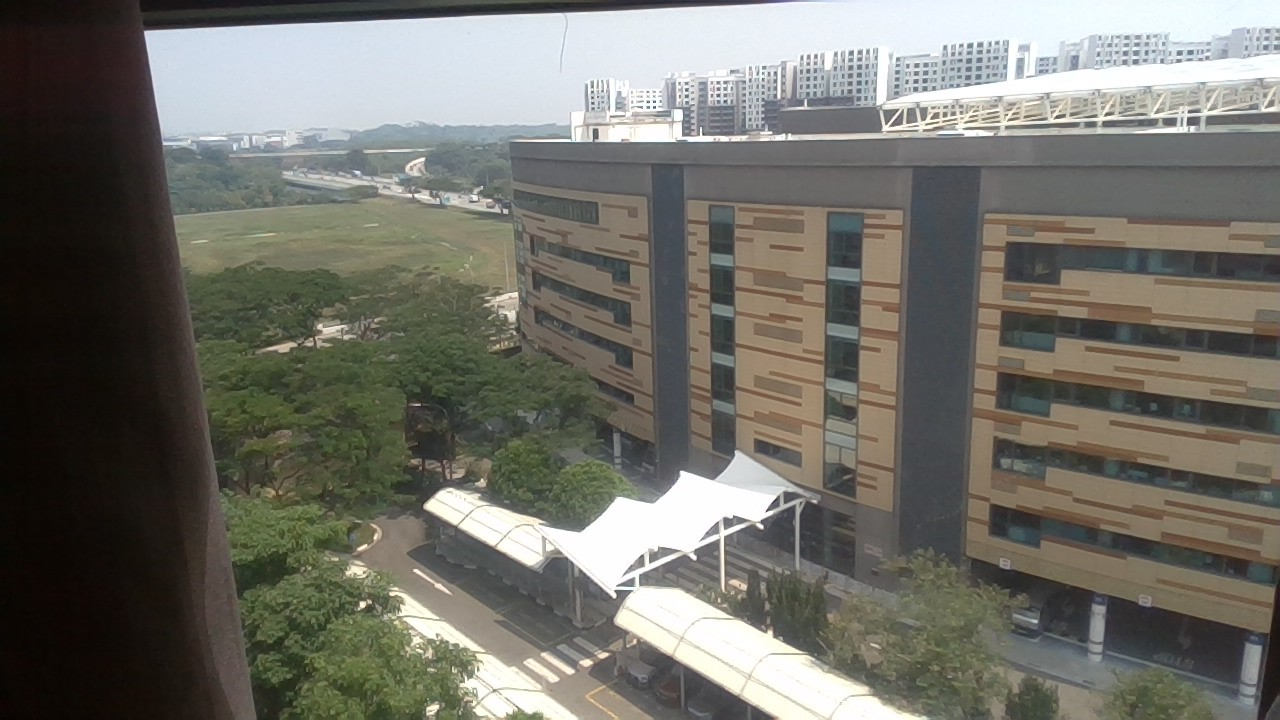
Global Indian International School (SMART branch) as viewed from Waterwoods

Global Indian International School (GIIS) is a Singapore-based international school established in 2002. With two campuses located in Punggol (Smart Campus) and Cheviot Hill (East Coast Campus), GIIS provides a diverse range of curricula options including GMP, IB PYP, IB DP, Cambridge IGCSE, CLSP, and CBSE. Admissions are open throughout the year. GIIS is under the Global Schools Foundation.

== History ==
GIIS' first campus at Cheviot Hill was established by Global Schools Foundation in 2002 with just 48 students, with the aim of providing education to the expatriate community in Singapore. In 2006, GIIS opened 2 other campuses in Malaysia and Japan and another campus in Singapore.

A new campus, PG Smart Campus, a mid school, was initially planned to start operations in July 2018, with a capacity of 3,000 students. However, a fire occurred during the construction of the newly planned campus, possibly due to burning rubber, delaying progress. The construction was eventually finished in the year 2018. The Queenstown , Balestier and recently East Coast campuses later shut down to merge with the new campus. The school has since expanded across South East Asia, Japan, the Middle East and India throughout the years.

== Campuses ==
GIIS has one campus in Singapore, the Punggol, SMART Campus.

Besides that, it has presence in over seven countries and 23 campuses which include those in Singapore, Malaysia (Kuala Lumpur), India (Hyderabad, Pune, Ahmedabad, Noida, and Bangalore), UAE (Abu Dhabi and Dubai), Thailand (Bangkok), Vietnam (Ho Chi Minh City) and Japan (Tokyo).

The GIIS campus in Surat discontinued its operations following challenges associated with the COVID-19 pandemic. As a result, its affiliation with the Central Board of Secondary Education (CBSE) was revoked, according to information provided by globalindianschool.org.

== Curriculum ==
Educational programs offered by GIIS include:

- Global Montessori Plus (GMP) Programme
- Central Board of Secondary Education (CBSE)
- International Baccalaureate Primary Years Programme (IB PYP) (In Singapore and Tokyo)
- Cambridge Lower Secondary Programme (CLSP) (In Singapore, Tokyo, Bangalore and Kuala Lumpur)
- Cambridge's International General Certificate of Secondary Education (IGCSE) (In Singapore, Kuala Lumpur, Bangalore)
- International Baccalaureate Diploma Programme (IBDP) (In Singapore, Tokyo)

== See also ==
- Global Indian International School, Tokyo Campus
- Global Indian International School, Pune
