= Koiwa Station =

Railway station in Tokyo, Japan

Coordinates: 35.733°N 139.8817°E

JB26 Koiwa Station 小岩駅
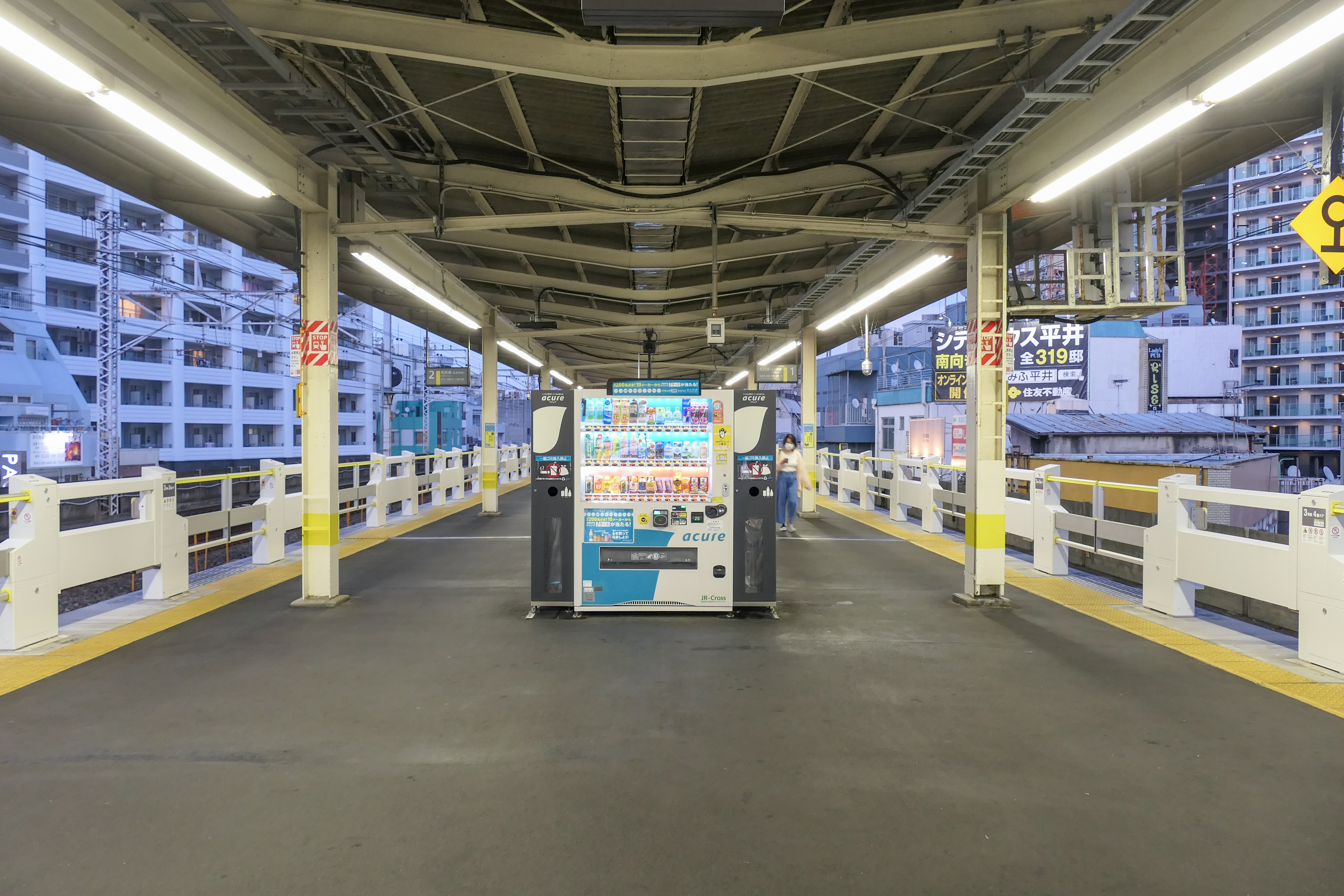
- Station Platforms, October 2022

General information
- Location: Edogawa, Tokyo; Japan
- Operator: JR East
- Line: Chūō-Sōbu Line

Other information
- Station code: JB26

History
- Opened: 1899

Passengers
- 63,288 daily

Services
Preceding station	JR East	Following station
Shin-Koiwa JB25 towards Mitaka	Chūō–Sōbu Line	Ichikawa JB27 towards Chiba
Location

Koiwa Station (小岩駅, Koiwa-eki) is a railway station on the Sōbu Main Line (Chūō-Sōbu Line) in Edogawa, Tokyo, Japan, operated by the East Japan Railway Company (JR East).

== Station layout ==
=== Platforms ===
1	Chūō-Sōbu Line	for Kinshichō, Akihabara, Shinjuku, Nakano and Mitaka
2	Chūō-Sōbu Line	for Nishi-Funabashi, Tsudanuma and Chiba

== History ==
Koiwa Station opened on 25 May 1899.
