= Edogawa, Tokyo =

Edogawa 江戸川区
- Special ward
- Edogawa City
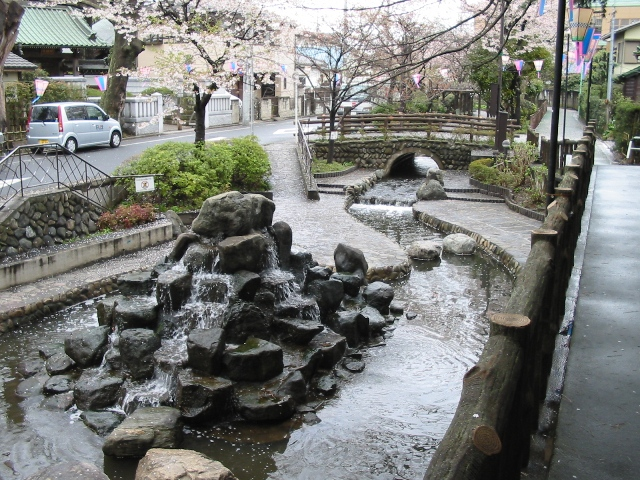
- Furukawa Waterside Park in Edogawa

- Flag Emblem

- Location of Edogawa in Tokyo Metropolis

- Location in Japan
- Coordinates: 35°42′N 139°53′E
- Country: Japan
- Region: Kantō
- Prefecture: Tokyo Metropolis
- First official recorded: 721 AD
- As City of Tokyo: October 1, 1932
- As Special ward of Tokyo: July 1, 1943

Government
  - Mayor: Takeshi Saitō (since April 2019)

Area
  - Total: 49.90 km^{2} (19.27 sq mi)

Population (October 1, 2020)
  - Total: 697,932
  - Density: 13,986/km^{2} (36,220/sq mi)

Ethnic groups: 97~99.5% Japanese; 0.5% Indian
- Time zone: UTC+09:00 (JST)
- Climate: Cfa
- Website: www.city.edogawa.tokyo.jp
- Symbols
- Flower: Rhododendron
- Tree: Cinnamonum camphora

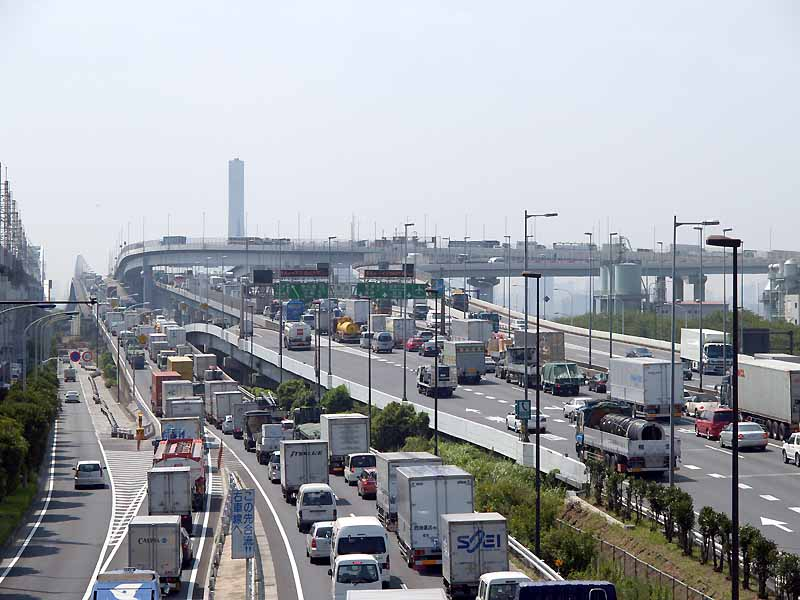
Kasai Junction, Shuto Expressway

Edogawa (江戸川区, Edogawa-ku; Japanese pronunciation: [è̞.dó̞.ɡä́.β̞ä́(.kɯ̈̀), -ŋä́-]) is a special ward in the Tokyo Metropolis in Japan. It takes its name from the Edo River that runs from north to south along the eastern edge of the ward. In English, it uses the name Edogawa City.

The easternmost of the wards, it shares boundaries with the cities of Urayasu and Ichikawa in Chiba Prefecture (to the east) and with the wards of Katsushika (to the north), Sumida and Kōtō (to the west). It meets the city of Matsudo in Chiba at a point.

Edogawa has a sister-city relationship with Gosford, New South Wales, Australia. Domestically, it has friendship ties with the cities of Azumino in Nagano Prefecture and Tsuruoka in Yamagata Prefecture.

As of January 1, 2020, the ward has an estimated population of 695,797, and a population density of 13,925 persons per km^{2}. The total area is 49.09 km^{2}.

== History ==
The ward was founded in 1932 with the merger of seven towns and villages in Minami-Katsushika District: the towns of Koiwa and Komatsugawa, and the villages of Kasai, Matsue, Mizue, Shinozaki and Shikamoto. At the time, the population was approximately 100,000 people.

In March 1945, over 10,000 homes were destroyed in the Komatsugawa district during the Bombing of Tokyo, including the ward office.

70% of Edogawa is below sea level and the area frequently experiences flooding. Typhoon Kathleen flooded 20,000 homes in the area in September 1947, and Typhoon Kitty and Typhoon Kanogawa have also caused significant damage.

== Climate ==
Climate data for Edogawa, Tokyo (1991−2020 normals, extremes 1976−present)
Month	Jan	Feb	Mar	Apr	May	Jun	Jul	Aug	Sep	Oct	Nov	Dec	Year
Record high °C (°F)	20.1 (68.2)	24.1 (75.4)	25.3 (77.5)	26.2 (79.2)	31.2 (88.2)	34.3 (93.7)	38.0 (100.4)	37.8 (100.0)	35.1 (95.2)	32.0 (89.6)	25.2 (77.4)	24.4 (75.9)	38.0 (100.4)
Mean daily maximum °C (°F)	9.8 (49.6)	10.5 (50.9)	13.4 (56.1)	18.0 (64.4)	22.2 (72.0)	25.0 (77.0)	28.6 (83.5)	30.3 (86.5)	27.0 (80.6)	21.9 (71.4)	17.0 (62.6)	12.2 (54.0)	19.7 (67.4)
Daily mean °C (°F)	6.0 (42.8)	6.5 (43.7)	9.4 (48.9)	14.0 (57.2)	18.4 (65.1)	21.5 (70.7)	25.1 (77.2)	26.7 (80.1)	23.6 (74.5)	18.4 (65.1)	13.3 (55.9)	8.4 (47.1)	15.9 (60.7)
Mean daily minimum °C (°F)	2.4 (36.3)	2.8 (37.0)	5.6 (42.1)	10.3 (50.5)	15.1 (59.2)	18.8 (65.8)	22.6 (72.7)	24.2 (75.6)	20.9 (69.6)	15.5 (59.9)	9.9 (49.8)	4.9 (40.8)	12.8 (54.9)
Record low °C (°F)	−3.7 (25.3)	−3.8 (25.2)	−4.1 (24.6)	0.7 (33.3)	7.1 (44.8)	11.5 (52.7)	14.7 (58.5)	17.0 (62.6)	12.3 (54.1)	6.3 (43.3)	0.5 (32.9)	−2.9 (26.8)	−4.1 (24.6)
Average precipitation mm (inches)	50.1 (1.97)	50.9 (2.00)	103.0 (4.06)	111.8 (4.40)	122.5 (4.82)	150.3 (5.92)	129.1 (5.08)	108.0 (4.25)	195.7 (7.70)	205.7 (8.10)	90.5 (3.56)	53.3 (2.10)	1,364 (53.70)
Average precipitation days (≥ 1.0 mm)	4.9	5.4	9.5	9.7	10.1	11.7	10.1	7.4	11.0	10.5	7.9	5.5	103.7
Source: JMA

== Demographics ==
Historical population
Year	Pop.	±%
1920	39,386	—
1930	96,971	+146.2%
1940	177,304	+82.8%
1945	146,497	−17.4%
1950	208,861	+42.6%
1960	316,593	+51.6%
1970	446,758	+41.1%
1980	495,231	+10.8%
1990	565,939	+14.3%
2000	619,953	+9.5%
2010	678,967	+9.5%
2020	697,932	+2.8%
Source: Censuses (Note: For years prior to 1930, figures cover the area of present-day Edogawa-ku.)

As of 2018, 3,758 people of Indian ancestry, about 10% of the people of Indian origin in Japan and about 30% of the people of Indian origin in Tokyo Metropolis, reside in Edogawa Ward. The Nishikasai area has a high concentration of Indian origin families. The Indian community increased when engineers came to Japan to fix the Y2K bug. Indian people settled in Nishikasai due to the proximity to the Tokyo Metro Tozai Line, which connects to their places of employment.

Nishikasai includes the Edogawa Indian Association. The head of the organization as of 2023, Jagmohan S. Chandrani, has been called the "father of Little India."

Restaurants serving the cuisine of northern India opened in the northern part of the community, while the southern part had southern Indian restaurants. Global Indian International School Tokyo caters to the Indian expatriate community.

== Districts and neighborhoods ==
Komatsugawa Area

- Hirai
- Komatsugawa

Matsue Area

- Chūō
- Funabori
- Higashikomatsugawa
- Matsue
- Matsushima
- Nishiichinoe
- Nishikomatsugawachō
- Ōsugi

Mizue Area

- Edogawa
- Haruechō
- Higashimizue
- Ichinoe
- Ichinoechō
- Mizue
- Nīhori
- Ninoechō

Kasai Area

- Higashikasai
- Horichō
- Kitakasai
- Minamikasai
- Nakakasai
- Nishikasai
- Rinkaichō
- Seishinchō
- Ukitachō

Shishibone Area

- Higashimatsumoto
- Hon'isshiki
- Kamiisshiki
- Matsumoto
- Okinomiyachō
- Shishibone
- Shishibonechō
- Yagouchi

Shinozaki Area

- Higashishinozaki
- Higashishinozakimachi
- Kamishinozaki
- Kitashinozaki
- Minamishinozakimachi
- Nishimizue
- Shimoshinozakimachi
- Shinozakimachi

Koiwa Area

- Higashikoiwa
- Kitakoiwa
- Minamikoiwa
- Nishikoiwa

== Sites ==
- Edogawa Boat Race Course
- Edogawa Stadium
- Kasai Seaside Park

== Notable people ==
- Akiko Hinagata, actress
- Ayano Tsujiuchi, Paralympic swimmer
- Daisuke Matsuzaka, baseball player (played for Seibu Lions and Boston Red Sox)
- Fūka Nagano, soccer player
- Hayato Aoki, baseball player
- Ira Ishida, novelist
- Kazuhide Uekusa, former economics professor at Waseda University convicted of sex offences
- Kazuya Kamenashi, J-pop idol, singer, actor, television host (member of KAT-TUN)
- Kazuyoshi Nakamura, actor
- Keita Ono, darts player
- Keizō Kanie, actor
- Kenta Suga, actor
- Kreva, rapper
- Maki Goto, singer (Morning Musume)
- Masahiro Yanagida, professional volleyball player
- Misako Uno, a Tarento, artist, actress, essayist and talent agent best known as a lead vocalist and dancer of the Co-ed performing arts group AAA.
- Norikazu Otsuka, announcer
- Romi Park, actress and voice actress
- Seiya Ando, basketball player
- Takamasa Suga, actor
- Takeshi Morishima, professional wrestler
- Tobizaru Masaya, sumo wrestler, highest rank komusubi
- Tochinishiki Kiyotaka, sumo wrestler, 44th yokozuna
- Tomochika Tsuboi, baseball player
- Yasuo Namekawa, a Korean–Japanese singer and television personality. He was the vocalist and oldest member of the South Korean hip-hop group M.I.B
- Yogendra Puranik, India-born politician
- Yoshiko Tamura, wrestler
- Yūsuke Koide, vocalist and guitarist for Base Ball Bear

== Education ==
Universities

- Aikoku Gakuen Junior College

Metropolitan high schools are operated by the Tokyo Metropolitan Government Board of Education.

- Edogawa High School
- Kasai Commercial High School
- Kasai South High School
- Koiwa High School
- Komatsugawa High School
- Momijigawa High School
- Shinozaki High School

Private High Schools:

- Edogawa Girls' Junior & High School

International schools:

- Global Indian International School, Tokyo Campus

Public elementary and junior high schools are operated by the Edogawa Board of Education (江戸川区教育委員会).

Junior high schools:

- Harue Junior High School (春江中学校)
- Higashi Kasai Junior High School (東葛西中学校)
- Kamiishiki Junior High School (上一色中学校)
- Kasai Junior High School (葛西中学校)
- Kasai No. 2 Junior High School (葛西第二中学校)
- Kasai No. 3 Junior High School (葛西第三中学校)
- Koiwa No. 1 Junior High School (小岩第一中学校)
- Koiwa No. 2 Junior High School (小岩第二中学校)
- Koiwa No. 3 Junior High School (小岩第三中学校)
- Koiwa No. 4 Junior High School (小岩第四中学校)
- Koiwa No. 5 Junior High School (小岩第五中学校)
- Komagatsukawa No. 1 Junior High School (小松川第一中学校)
- Komagatsukawa No. 2 Junior High School (小松川第二中学校)
- Komagatsukawa No. 3 Junior High School (小松川第三中学校)
- Matsue No. 1 Junior High School (松江第一中学校)
- Matsue No. 2 Junior High School (松江第二中学校)
- Matsue No. 3 Junior High School (松江第三中学校)
- Matsue No. 4 Junior High School (松江第四中学校)
- Matsue No. 5 Junior High School (松江第五中学校)
- Matsue No. 6 Junior High School (松江第六中学校)
- Minami Kasai Junior High School (南葛西中学校)
- Minami Kasai No. 2 Junior High School (南葛西第二中学校)
- Mizue Junior High School (瑞江中学校)
- Mizue No. 2 Junior High School (瑞江第二中学校)
- Mizue No. 3 Junior High School (瑞江第三中学校)
- Ninoe Junior High School (二之江中学校)
- Nishi Kasai Junior High School (西葛西中学校)
- Seishin No. 1 Junior High School (清新第一中学校)
- Seishin No. 2 Junior High School (清新第二中学校)
- Shikamoto Junior High School (鹿本中学校)
- Shinozaki Junior High School (篠崎中学校)
- Shinozaki No. 2 Junior High School (篠崎第二中学校)
- Shishibone Junior High School (鹿骨中学校)

Elementary schools:

- No. 2 Kasai Elementary School (第二葛西小学校)
- No. 3 Kasai Elementary School (第三葛西小学校)
- No. 4 Kasai Elementary School (第四葛西小学校)
- No. 5 Kasai Elementary School (第五葛西小学校)
- No. 6 Kasai Elementary School (第六葛西小学校)
- No. 7 Kasai Elementary School (第七葛西小学校)
- No. 2 Matsue Elementary School (第二松江小学校)
- No. 3 Matsue Elementary School (第三松江小学校)
- Edogawa Elementary School (江戸川小学校)
- Funabori Elementary School (船堀小学校)
- Funabori No. 2 Elementary School (船堀第二小学校)
- Harue Elementary School (春江小学校)
- Higashi Kasai Elementary School (東葛西小学校)
- Higashi Koiwa Elementary School (東小岩小学校)
- Higashi-Komatsugawa Elementary School (東小松川小学校)
- Hirai Elementary School (平井小学校)
- Hirai Higashi Elementary School (平井東小学校)
- Hirai Minami Elementary School (平井南小学校)
- Hirai Nishi Elementary School (平井西小学校)
- Hon-Isshiki Elementary School (本一色小学校)
- Ichinoe Elementary School (一之江小学校)
- Ichinoe No. 2 Elementary School (一之江第二小学校)
- Kamata Elementary School (鎌田小学校)
- Kami-Isshiki Minami Elementary School (上一色南小学校)
- Kamikoiwa Elementary School (上小岩小学校)
- Kamikoiwa No. 2 Elementary School (上小岩第二小学校)
- Kasai Elementary School (葛西小学校)
- Kita Koiwa Elementary School (北小岩小学校)
- Koiwa Elementary School (小岩小学校)
- Komagatsugawa Elementary School (小松川小学校)
- Komagatsugawa No. 2 Elementary School (小松川第二小学校)
- Matsue Elementary School (松江小学校)
- Matsumoto Elementary School (松本小学校)
- Minami Kasai Elementary School (南葛西小学校)
- Minami Kasai No. 2 Elementary School (南葛西第二小学校)
- Minami Kasai No. 3 Elementary School (南葛西第三小学校)
- Minami Koiwa Elementary School (南小岩小学校)
- Minami Koiwa No. 2 Elementary School (南小岩第二小学校)
- Minami Shinozaki Elementary School (南篠崎小学校)
- Mizue Elementary School (瑞江小学校)
- Naka Koiwa Elementary School (中小岩小学校)
- Niihori Elementary School (新堀小学校)
- Ninoe Elementary School (二之江小学校)
- Ninoe No. 2 Elementary School (二之江第二小学校)
- Ninoe No. 3 Elementary School (二之江第三小学校)
- Nishiichinoe Elementary School (西一之江小学校)
- Nishi Kasai Elementary School (西葛西小学校)
- Nishi Koiwa Elementary School (西小岩小学校)
- Nishikomatsugawa Elementary School (西小松川小学校)
- Osugi Elementary School (大杉小学校)
- Osugi No. 2 Elementary School (大杉第二小学校)
- Osugi Higashi Elementary School (大杉東小学校)
- Rinkai Elementary School (臨海小学校)
- Seishin No. 1 Elementary School (清新第一小学校)
- Seishin Futaba Elementary School (清新ふたば小学校)
- Shikamoto Elementary School (鹿本小学校)
- Shimokamata Elementary School (下鎌田小学校)
- Shimokamata Higashi Elementary School (下鎌田東小学校)
- Shimokamata Nishi Elementary School (下鎌田西小学校)
- Shimokoiwa Elementary School (下小岩小学校)
- Shimokoiwa No. 2 Elementary School (下小岩第二小学校)
- Shinden Elementary School (新田小学校)
- Shinozaki Elementary School (篠崎小学校)
- Shinozaki No. 2 Elementary School (篠崎第二小学校)
- Shinozaki No. 3 Elementary School (篠崎第三小学校)
- Shinozaki No. 4 Elementary School (篠崎第四小学校)
- Shinozaki No. 5 Elementary School (篠崎第五小学校)
- Shishibone Elementary School (鹿骨小学校)
- Shishibone Higashi Elementary School (鹿骨東小学校)
- Ukita Elementary School (宇喜田小学校)

== Transportation ==
=== Rail ===
■ East Japan Railway Company
■ Chūō-Sōbu Line
- – Hirai – Shin-Koiwa(Shin-Koiwa Station is in Katsushika, Tokyo) – Koiwa –
■ Keiyō Line
- – Kasairinkai-Kōen –
■ Keisei Electric Railway
■ Keisei Main Line
- – Keisei Koiwa – Edogawa –
■ Toei
○ Toei Shinjuku Line
- – Higashi-Ōjima – Funabori – Ichinoe – Mizue – Shinozaki –
■ Tokyo Metro
○ Tozai Line
- – Nishi-Kasai – Kasai –

=== Highway ===
- Shuto Expressway
  - C2 Central Loop
  - No.7 Komatsugawa Route
  - B Bayshore Route
