= Global Indian International School, Tokyo =

- グローバル・インディアン・インターナショナル・スクール

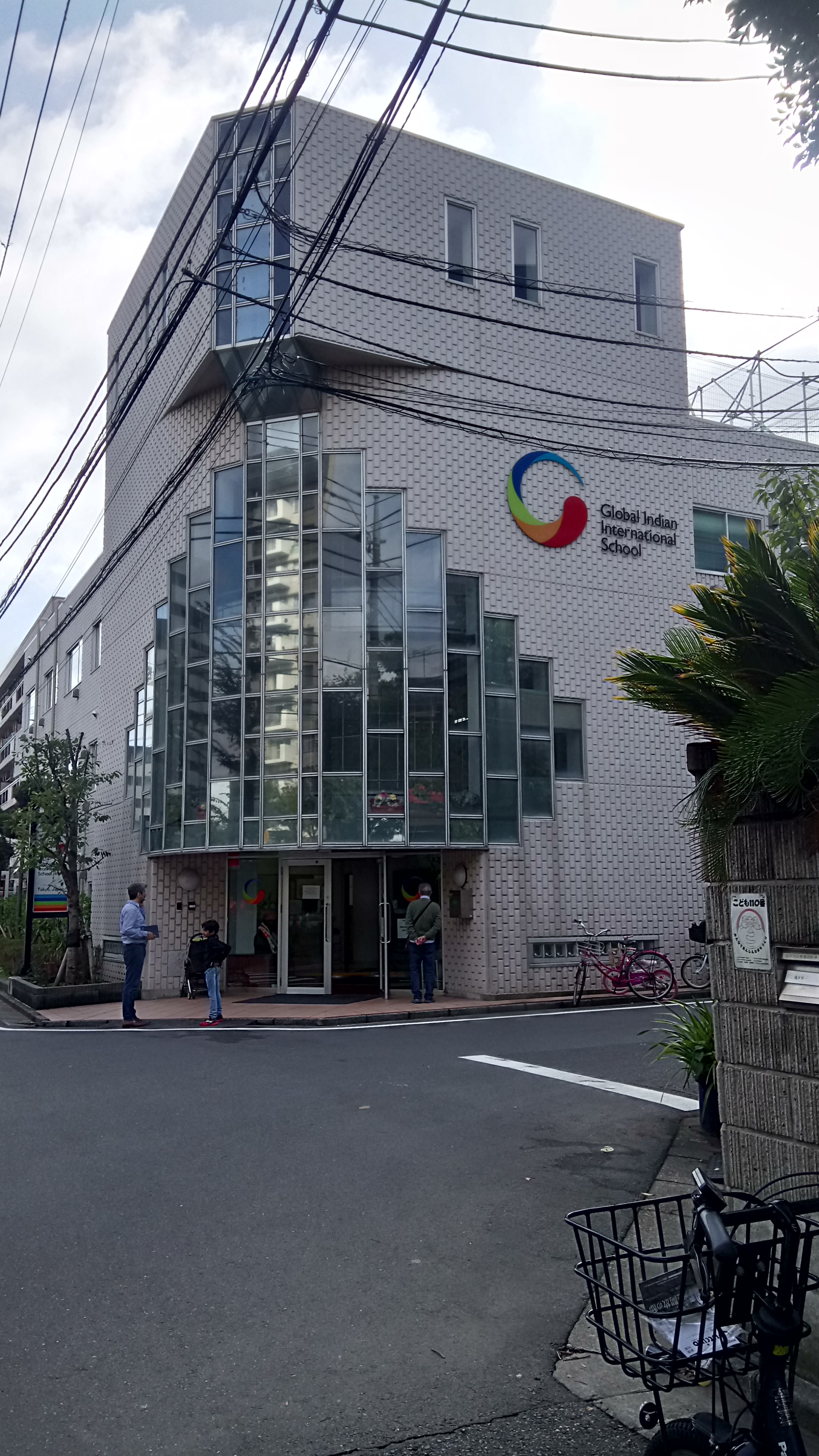

Location
- 8-3-13 Nishi Kasai, Edogawa-ku, Tokyo, Japan 133 0088 〒133-0088 東京都江戸川区西葛西 8-3-13; 35°39′24″N 139°51′32″E

Information
- Website: globalindianschool.org/jp/tokyo/

Global Indian International School, Tokyo or GIIS Tokyo NishiKasai (Japanese: グローバル・インディアン・インターナショナル・スクール, Hepburn: Gurōbaru Indian Intānashonaru Sukūru) is an Indian International School in Edogawa-ku, Tokyo, Japan. It is a part of the Global Indian International School network and adopts the International Baccalaureate Diploma and Central Board of Secondary Education (CBSE) curriculum of India.

== History ==
The school was established in July 2006 with just 50 students title=Tokyo's Nishikasai a second home for Indians in Japan |url=https://www.thestatesman.com/world/tokyos-nishikasai-second-home-indians-japan-1502638470.html|access-date=2025-06-06 |website=The Statesman |language=en |via=Yomiuri Shimbun}}</ref> | It provides K-12 education with English as the sole medium of instruction. Currently, the school has four campuses in Edogawa-ku, Tokyo.

As of 2022, the school had approximately 1,220 students. Approximately half of the students are Japanese nationals. Another one-third are Indian nationals, and the rest are of various other nationalities. The school has lately become known for its low-cost English and STEM programs.

=== Campuses ===
The first campus was opened 2006 in Edogawa, expanded with new campuses in 2017 and 2019, with a fourth campus was opened in 2023 at Kita Kasai within the same ward.

== See also ==
- List of high schools in Tokyo
- Indians in Japan
