= Takakusu Junjiro =

Japanese Buddhist studies scholar (1866–1945)

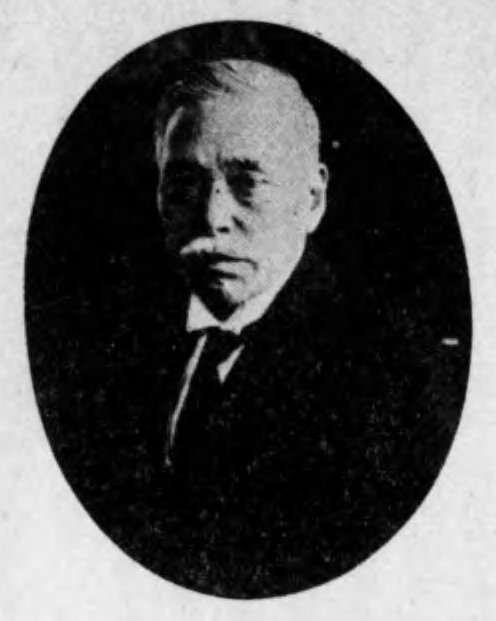
- Born: June 29, 1866; Yahata, Hiroshima Prefecture, Japan
- Died: June 28, 1945 (aged 78)
- Other name: Umetarō Sawai
- Occupation: Buddhist scholar

Takakusu Junjirō (高楠 順次郎; June 29, 1866 – June 28, 1945), who often published as J. Takakusu, was a Buddhist Studies scholar and Sanskritist who is known internationally for leading the work to compile and edit the Taishō Shinshū Daizōkyō, a modern edition of the Chinese Buddhist Canon that was highly influential on Buddhist studies and remains in use by scholars today. An advocate for the expansion of higher education, Takakusu founded a Buddhist girl's school in 1924, which eventually became Musashino University.

Takakusu was also an active Esperantist.

== Early life ==
Takakusu was born in Yahata in Hiroshima Prefecture, adopted by the Takakusu family of Kobe, and sent to England to study Sanskrit at Oxford University (1890). After receiving his doctorate, he continued his studies in France and Germany.

== Academic career ==
Upon his return to Japan in 1894, he was appointed lecturer and then professor at the Tokyo Imperial University and director of Tokyo School of Foreign Languages.

He founded the Musashino Girls' School in 1924. The institution evolved on the principle of "Buddhist-based human education," moving in 1929 to its present location in Nishitōkyō, Tokyo and becoming Musashino Women's University. The institution Takakusu founded is now known as Musashino University (武蔵野大学, Musashino Daigaku).

From 1924 to 1934, Takakusu, along with other 300 scholars like Kaigyoku Watanabe, and Ono Genmyo, established the Tokyo Taisho Tripitaka Publication Association (東京大正一切經刊行會), later known as the Daizo Shuppansha (大藏出版株式會社, Daizo shuppansha), which collected, edited, and published a modern academic edition of the Chinese Buddhist Canon which became known as the Taishō Shinshū Daizōkyō. This massive compendium is now available online as the SAT Taishō Database, and the CBETA Tripitaka. This edition of the Buddhist Canon was published in Tokyo between 1924 and 1934 in 100 volumes. It is one of the first editions of the canon with modern punctuation and modern scholarly notes. The scholars working on this project drew from various editions of the Chinese Canon, mainly the second edition of the Korean canon along with various Japanese canonical editions and the Ming era Jiaxing Canon. Furthermore, the Japanese scholars also referenced the Pali canon and Sanskrit manuscripts, making it the most scholarly and comprehensive Buddhist canon of its time.

The Taishō editors also compiled catalogues, an index, and a glossary. The Taishō scholars also provided scholarly annotations that contain alternate readings from other sources. The Taishō canon was also revolutionary in the way it organized the canonical texts. It abandoned the traditional canonical schemas of organization which date back to the Kaiyuan catalogue in favor of a modern organizational schema based on historical development.

In 1930, he was named President of the Tokyo Imperial University. He was a member of the Imperial Academy of Japan and a Fellow of the British Academy. He was a recipient of Asahi Cultural Prize and the Japanese government's Order of Culture. He was awarded an honorary degree by Tokyo Imperial University; and he was similarly honored by the universities at Oxford, Leipzig, and Heidelberg.

At the time of his death in June 1945, he was Professor Emeritus of Sanskrit at the Tokyo Imperial University.

== Devotion to Esperanto ==
In 1906, he was one of the founder member of the Japanese Esperantists Association (JEA), and its head in the Tokyo section. When in 1919, a new organization, the Japanese Esperanto Institute (JEI) was founded, he became a member of the director board.

== Honors ==
- Prix Stanislas Julien by the Academie des Inscriptions et Belles—Lettres of France in 1929
- Asahi Prize in 1932
- Order of Culture, 1944

== Selected works ==
- The Amitâyur dhyâna-sûtra, trans J. Takakusu, in Buddhist Mahâyâna Texts, Part 2, published in Sacred Books of the East, vol. 49, pp. 161–201, Oxford University Press, 1894.
- A Record of the Buddhist Religion as Practised in India and the Malay Archipelago, London: Clarendon Press, 1896.
- Dai Nihon Bukkyō zensho (The Great Buddhist Works of Japan), ed. Takakusu Junjirō et al., 150 volumes, Tokyo: Dai Nihon Bukkyō zensho kankōkai, 1913-1921. (Re-edited, 100 volumes, Suzuki gakujutsu zaidan, Tokyo: Kōdansha, 1970-1973.)
- Taishō shinshū Daizōkyō 大正新脩大蔵経, Takakusu Junjirō, Watanabe Kaigyoku. 100 volumes, Tokyo: Taisho Issaikyo Kankokai, 1924-1934.
- Nanden daizōkyō 南伝大蔵経 (The Mahātripiṭaka of the Southern Tradition) [Japanese translation of the Pāli Canon], ed. Takakusu Junjirō. 65 volumes, Tokyo: Daizokyo shuppansha, 1935-1941.
- The Essentials of Buddhist Philosophy, ed. Wing-tsit Chan and Charles Moors. Greenwood Press, Westport, CT. 1976
- Upanishatto Zensho (Complete Works of the Upanishads) (1922-1924), 9-volumes, Tokyo.
- Takakusu Junjirō Zenshū (The Collected Works of Takakusu Junjirō). Published in 10 volumes by Kyoiku Shinchosha in Tokyo in 1977.
- From Śākyamuni Tathāgata to Shinran Shōnin By Takakusu Junjirō (1938)

== See also ==
- Japanese students in Britain
