= Chuo Elementary School =

Chuo Elementary School (中央小学校, Chūō Shōgakkō) may refer to one of many schools in Japan.

== Kanto ==
- Chuo Elementary School (Tokyo)
- Chuo Elementary School (JA) - Sagamihara, Kanagawa Prefecture
- Chuo Elementary School (JA) - Warabi, Saitama Prefecture
