= Miho Tanaka =

Miho Tanaka may refer to:

- Miho Tanaka (badminton) (born 1976), Japanese badminton player
- Miho Tanaka (model) (born 1983), Japanese model
