= Ono Genmyo =

Ono Genmyō (小野玄妙, 1883–1939) was a Japanese scholar of Buddhism and Buddhist art. A native of Kanagawa Prefecture, Ono's large body of work includes the seminal The Artworks and History of Buddhism.

Along with Junjiro Takakusu, Ono was one of the leaders and editors of the monumental Taishō Tripiṭaka (taishō shinshū daizōkyō 大正新脩大藏經) project, which produced a revolutionary modern edition of the Chinese Buddhist canon.

He died of a cerebral hemorrhage in 1939.
