= List of elementary schools in Tokyo =

This is a list of Elementary Schools in Tokyo Metropolis, including the 23 special wards, West Tokyo, and the Tokyo Islands (Izu Islands and Ogasawara Subprefecture).

== National ==
- Ochanomizu University Elementary School (お茶の水女子大学附属小学校)
- Tokyo Gakugei University Koganei Elementary School (東京学芸大学附属小金井小学校)
- Tokyo Gakugei University Oizumi Elementary School (東京学芸大学附属大泉小学校)
- Tokyo Gakugei University Setagaya Elementary School (東京学芸大学附属世田谷小学校)
- Tokyo Gakugei University Takehaya Elementary School (東京学芸大学附属竹早小学校)
- Elementary School Attached to University of Tsukuba (筑波大学附属小学校)

== Municipal ==
=== 23 Wards ===
==== Adachi ====
Combined elementary and junior high schools:

- Okimoto Ogi Gakuen (興本扇学園)
- Shinden Gakuen (新田学園)

Elementary schools:

- Adachi Elementary School (足立小学校)
- Adachi Iriya Elementary School (足立入谷小学校)
- Aoi Elementary School (青井小学校)
- Ayase Elementary School (綾瀬小学校)
- Fuchie Elementary School (渕江小学校)
- Fuchie No. 1 Elementary School (渕江第一小学校)
- Hanahata Elementary School (花畑小学校)
- Hanahata No. 1 Elementary School (花畑第一小学校)
- Hanahata Nishi Elementary School (花畑西小学校)
- Hanaho Elementary School (花保小学校)
- Higashi Ayase Elementary School (東綾瀬小学校)
- Higashi Fuchie Elementary School (東渕江小学校)
- Higashi Kahei Elementary School (東加平小学校)
- Higashi Kurihara Elementary School (東栗原小学校)
- Higashi Iko Elementary School (東伊興小学校)
- Hirano Elementary School (平野小学校)
- Hokima Elementary School (保木間小学校)
- Iko Elementary School (伊興小学校)
- Kahei Elementary School (加平小学校)
- Kameda Elementary School (亀田小学校)
- Kita Sanya Elementary School (北三谷小学校)
- Kita Shikahama Elementary School (北鹿浜小学校)
- Kodo Elementary School (弘道小学校)
- Kodo No. 1 Elementary School (弘道第一小学校)
- Kohoku Elementary School (江北小学校)
- Kohiya Elementary School (古千谷小学校)
- Kurihara Elementary School (栗原小学校)
- Kurihara Kita Elementary School (栗原北小学校)
- Kurishima Elementary School (栗島小学校)
- Miyagi Elementary School (宮城小学校)
- Motoki Elementary School (本木小学校)
- Mutsugi Elementary School (六木小学校)
- Nagato Elementary School (長門小学校)
- Nakagawa Elementary School (中川小学校)
- Nakagawa Higashi Elementary School (中川東小学校)
- Nakagawa Kita Elementary School (中川北小学校)
- Nakashimane Elementary School (中島根小学校)
- Nishi-Arai Elementary School (西新井小学校)
- Nishi-Arai No. 1 Elementary School (西新井第一小学校)
- Nishi-Arai No. 2 Elementary School (西新井第二小学校)
- Nishi Hokima Elementary School (西保木間小学校)
- Nishi-Iko Elementary School (西伊興小学校)
- Ogi Elementary School (扇小学校)
- Oka Elementary School (桜花小学校)
- Oyata Elementary School (大谷田小学校)
- Saranuma Elementary School (立皿沼小学校)
- Sekibara Elementary School (関原小学校)
- Senju Elementary School (千寿小学校)
- Senju No. 8 Elementary School (千寿第八小学校)
- Senju Futaba Elementary School (千寿双葉小学校)
- Senju Honcho Elementary School (千寿本町小学校)
- Senju Joto Elementary School (千寿常東小学校)
- Senju Sakura Elementary School (千寿桜小学校)
- Shikahama No. 1 Elementary School (鹿浜第一小学校)
- Shikahama-Goshikizakura Elementary School (鹿浜五色桜小学校)
- Shikahamanishi Elementary School (鹿浜西小学校)
- Shimane Elementary School (島根小学校)
- Takenozuka Elementary School (竹の塚小学校)
- Tatsunuma Elementary School (辰沼小学校)
- Teraji Elementary School (寺地小学校)
- Toneri Elementary School (舎人小学校)
- Toneri No. 1 Elementary School (舎人第一小学校)
- Umejima Elementary School (梅島小学校)
- Umejima No. 1 Elementary School (梅島第一小学校)
- Umejima No. 2 Elementary School (梅島第二小学校)
- Yayoi Elementary School (弥生小学校)

==== Arakawa ====
- No. 2 Haketa Elementary School (第二峡田小学校)
- No. 3 Haketa Elementary School (第三峡田小学校)
- No. 4 Haketa Elementary School (第四峡田小学校)
- No. 5 Haketa Elementary School (第五峡田小学校)
- No. 7 Haketa Elementary School (第七峡田小学校)
- No. 9 Haketa Elementary School (第九峡田小学校)
- No. 1 Nippori Elementary School (第一日暮里小学校)
- No. 2 Nippori Elementary School (第二日暮里小学校)
- No. 3 Nippori Elementary School (第三日暮里小学校)
- No. 6 Nippori Elementary School (第六日暮里小学校)
- No. 2 Zuiko Elementary School (第二瑞光小学校)
- No. 3 Zuiko Elementary School (第三瑞光小学校)
- No. 6 Zuiko Elementary School (第六瑞光小学校)
- Akado Elementary School (赤土小学校)
- Daimon Elementary School (大門小学校)
- Haketa Elementary School (峡田小学校)
- Higurashi Elementary School (ひぐらし小学校)
- Ogu Elementary School (尾久小学校)
- Ogu No. 6 Elementary School (尾久第六小学校)
- Ogu Miyamae Elementary School (尾久宮前小学校)
- Ogu Nishi Elementary School (尾久西小学校)
- Shioiri Elementary School (汐入小学校)
- Shioiri Higashi Elementary School (汐入東小学校)
- Zuiko Elementary School (瑞光小学校)

==== Bunkyo ====
- Aoyagi Elementary School (青柳小学校)
- Hayashicho Elementary School (林町小学校)
- Hongo Elementary School (本郷小学校)
- Kagomachi Elementary School (駕籠町小学校)
- Kanatomi Elementary School (金富小学校)
- Kohinata Daimachi Elementary School (小日向台町小学校)
- Komamoto Elementary School (駒本小学校)
- Kubomachi Elementary School (窪町小学校)
- Meika Elementary School (明化小学校)
- Nezu Elementary School (根津小学校)
- Otsuka Elementary School (大塚小学校)
- Rekisen Elementary School (礫川小学校)
- Sasugaya Elementary School (指ケ谷小学校)
- Seishi Elementary School (誠之小学校)
- Sekiguchi Daimachi Elementary School (関口台町小学校)
- Sendagi Elementary School (千駄木小学校)
- Shiomi Elementary School (汐見小学校)
- Showa Elementary School (昭和小学校)
- Yanagicho Elementary School (柳町小学校)
- Yushima Elementary School (湯島小学校)

==== Chiyoda ====
- Banchō Elementary School (番町小学校) - Rokubanchō
- Chiyoda Elementary School (千代田小学校) - Tsukasamachi
  - It was created in April 1993 (Heisei 5) as a merger of Chisakura Elementary School (千桜小学校) and Kanda Elementary School (神田小学校), and it also took a portion of the former boundary of Nagatatcho Elementary School (永田町小学校).
- Fujimi Elementary School (富士見小学校) - Fujimi
- Izumi Elementary School (和泉小学校) - Izumichō
  - Established in 1993, it is a consolidation of Imagawa Elementary School (今川小学校) and Sakuma Elementary School (佐久間小学校).
- Kudan Elementary School (九段小学校) - Sanbanchō
- Kōjimachi Elementary School (麹町小学校) - Kōjimachi
  - It was formed from the merger of the former Kōjimachi Elementary and Nagatacho Elementary School (永田町小学校).
- Ochanomizu Elementary School (お茶の水小学校) - Fujimi
  - It was created in 1993 as the merger of Kinka Elementary School (錦華小学校), Nishikanda Elementary School (西神田小学), and Ogawa Elementary School (小川小学校). The Kinka building became the Ochanomizu Elementary building.
- Shohei Elementary School (昌平小学校) - Sotokanda
  - It was established in 1993. It is on the site of the former Horin Elementary School (芳林小学校). It was initially held in the previous Awaji Elementary School (淡路小学校) before its current building opened in 1996.

==== Chuo ====
- Akashi Elementary School (明石小学校) - Akashicho
  - Its previous building opened in 1926. The Architectural Institute of Japan advocated for retaining the building, but the board of education chose to raze the building and build a new one.
- Arima Elementary School (有馬小学校) - Nihonbashi Kakigaracho
- Chuo Elementary School - Minato
  - Formed on April 1, 1993 (Heisei 5) by the merger of Kyoka Elementary School (京華小学校) and Teppozu Elementary School (鉄砲洲小学校).
- Hisamatsu Elementary School (久松小学校) - Nihonbashi Hisamatsucho
- Joto Elementary School (城東小学校) - Yaesu
- Kyobashi Tsukiji Elementary School (京橋築地小学校) - Tsukiji
- Meisho Elementary School (明正小学校) - Shinkawa
- Nihonbashi Elementary School (日本橋小学校) - Nihonbashi Ningyocho
- Sakamoto Elementary School (阪本小学校) - Nihonbashi Kabutocho
- Taimei Elementary School - Ginza
- Tokiwa Elementary School (常盤小学校) - Nihonbashi Hongokucho
- Toyomi Elementary School (豊海小学校) - Toyomicho
- Tsukishima Daiichi (No. 1) Elementary School (島第一小学校)
- Tsukishima Daini (No. 2) Elementary School (島第二小学校) - Kachidoki
- Tsukishima Daisan (No. 3) Elementary School (島第三小学校) - Harumi
- Tsukudajima Elementary School (佃島小学校)

==== Edogawa ====
- No. 2 Kasai Elementary School (第二葛西小学校)
- No. 3 Kasai Elementary School (第三葛西小学校)
- No. 4 Kasai Elementary School (第四葛西小学校)
- No. 5 Kasai Elementary School (第五葛西小学校)
- No. 6 Kasai Elementary School (第六葛西小学校)
- No. 7 Kasai Elementary School (第七葛西小学校)
- No. 2 Matsue Elementary School (第二松江小学校)
- No. 3 Matsue Elementary School (第三松江小学校)
- Edogawa Elementary School (江戸川小学校)
- Funabori Elementary School (船堀小学校)
- Funabori No. 2 Elementary School (船堀第二小学校)
- Harue Elementary School (春江小学校)
- Higashi Kasai Elementary School (東葛西小学校)
- Higashi Koiwa Elementary School (東小岩小学校)
- Higashi-Komatsugawa Elementary School (東小松川小学校)
- Hirai Elementary School (平井小学校)
- Hirai Higashi Elementary School (平井東小学校)
- Hirai Minami Elementary School (平井南小学校)
- Hirai Nishi Elementary School (平井西小学校)
- Hon-Isshiki Elementary School (本一色小学校)
- Ichinoe Elementary School (一之江小学校)
- Ichinoe No. 2 Elementary School (一之江第二小学校)
- Kamata Elementary School (鎌田小学校)
- Kami-Isshiki Minami Elementary School (上一色南小学校)
- Kamikoiwa Elementary School (上小岩小学校)
- Kamikoiwa No. 2 Elementary School (上小岩第二小学校)
- Kasai Elementary School (葛西小学校)
- Kita Koiwa Elementary School (北小岩小学校)
- Koiwa Elementary School (小岩小学校)
- Komagatsugawa Elementary School (小松川小学校)
- Komagatsugawa No. 2 Elementary School (小松川第二小学校)
- Matsue Elementary School (松江小学校)
- Matsumoto Elementary School (松本小学校)
- Minami Kasai Elementary School (南葛西小学校)
- Minami Kasai No. 2 Elementary School (南葛西第二小学校)
- Minami Kasai No. 3 Elementary School (南葛西第三小学校)
- Minami Koiwa Elementary School (南小岩小学校)
- Minami Koiwa No. 2 Elementary School (南小岩第二小学校)
- Minami Shinozaki Elementary School (南篠崎小学校)
- Mizue Elementary School (瑞江小学校)
- Naka Koiwa Elementary School (中小岩小学校)
- Niihori Elementary School (新堀小学校)
- Ninoe Elementary School (二之江小学校)
- Ninoe No. 2 Elementary School (二之江第二小学校)
- Ninoe No. 3 Elementary School (二之江第三小学校)
- Nishiichinoe Elementary School (西一之江小学校)
- Nishi Kasai Elementary School (西葛西小学校)
- Nishi Koiwa Elementary School (西小岩小学校)
- Nishikomatsugawa Elementary School (西小松川小学校)
- Osugi Elementary School (大杉小学校)
- Osugi No. 2 Elementary School (大杉第二小学校)
- Osugi Higashi Elementary School (大杉東小学校)
- Rinkai Elementary School (臨海小学校)
- Seishin No. 1 Elementary School (清新第一小学校)
- Seishin Futaba Elementary School (清新ふたば小学校)
- Shikamoto Elementary School (鹿本小学校)
- Shimokamata Elementary School (下鎌田小学校)
- Shimokamata Higashi Elementary School (下鎌田東小学校)
- Shimokamata Nishi Elementary School (下鎌田西小学校)
- Shimokoiwa Elementary School (下小岩小学校)
- Shimokoiwa No. 2 Elementary School (下小岩第二小学校)
- Shinden Elementary School (新田小学校)
- Shinozaki Elementary School (篠崎小学校)
- Shinozaki No. 2 Elementary School (篠崎第二小学校)
- Shinozaki No. 3 Elementary School (篠崎第三小学校)
- Shinozaki No. 4 Elementary School (篠崎第四小学校)
- Shinozaki No. 5 Elementary School (篠崎第五小学校)
- Shishibone Elementary School (鹿骨小学校)
- Shishibone Higashi Elementary School (鹿骨東小学校)
- Ukita Elementary School (宇喜田小学校)

==== Itabashi ====
- Akatsuka Elementary School (赤塚小学校)
- Akatsuka Shinmachi Elementary School (赤塚新町小学校)
- Fujimidai Elementary School (富士見台小学校)
- Funado Elementary School (舟渡小学校)
- Hasune Elementary School (蓮根小学校)
- Hasune No. 2 Elementary School (蓮根第二小学校)
- Itabashi No. 1 Elementary School (板橋第一小学校)
- Itabashi No. 2 Elementary School (板橋第二小学校)
- Itabashi No. 4 Elementary School (板橋第四小学校)
- Itabashi No. 5 Elementary School (板橋第五小学校)
- Itabashi No. 6 Elementary School (板橋第六小学校)
- Itabashi No. 7 Elementary School (板橋第七小学校)
- Itabashi No. 8 Elementary School (板橋第八小学校)
- Itabashi No. 10 Elementary School (板橋第十小学校)
- Kaga Elementary School (加賀小学校)
- Kamiitabashi Elementary School (上板橋小学校)
- Kamiitabashi No. 2 Elementary School (上板橋第二小学校)
- Kamiitabashi No. 4 Elementary School (上板橋第四小学校)
- Kanazawa Elementary School (金沢小学校)
- Kita Maeno Elementary School (北前野小学校)
- Kitano Elementary School (北野小学校)
- Kobai Elementary School (紅梅小学校)
- Maeno Elementary School (前野小学校)
- Midori Elementary School (緑小学校)
- Misono Elementary School (三園小学校)
- Mukaihara Elementary School (向原小学校)
- Nakadai Elementary School (中台小学校)
- Nakanebashi Elementary School (中根橋小学校)
- Narimasu Elementary School (成増小学校)
- Narimasugaoka Elementary School (成増ケ丘小学校)
- Oyaguchi Elementary School (大谷口小学校)
- Sakuragawa Elementary School (桜川小学校)
- Shimo Akatsuka Elementary School (下赤塚小学校)
- Shimura Elementary School (志村小学校)
- Shimura No. 1 Elementary School (志村第一小学校)
- Shimura No. 2 Elementary School (志村第二小学校)
- Shimura No. 3 Elementary School (志村第三小学校)
- Shimura No. 4 Elementary School (志村第四小学校)
- Shimura No. 5 Elementary School (志村第五小学校)
- Shimura No. 6 Elementary School (志村第六小学校)
- Shimura Sakashita Elementary School (志村坂下小学校)
- Shingashi Elementary School (新河岸小学校)
- Takashima No. 1 Elementary School (高島第一小学校)
- Takashima No. 2 Elementary School (高島第二小学校)
- Takashima No. 3 Elementary School (高島第三小学校)
- Takashima No. 5 Elementary School (高島第五小学校)
- Takashima No. 6 Elementary School (高島第六小学校)
- Tokiwadai Elementary School (常盤台小学校)
- Tokumaru Elementary School (徳丸小学校)
- Wakagi Elementary School (若木小学校)
- Yayoi Elementary School (弥生小学校)

==== Katsushika ====
- Aoto Elementary School (青戸小学校)
- Futakami Elementary School (二上小学校)
- Hananoki Elementary School (花の木小学校)
- Handa Elementary School (半田小学校)
- Harada Elementary School (原田小学校)
- Higashi (East) Ayase Elementary School (東綾瀬小学校)
- Higashi Kanamachi Elementary School (東金町小学校)
- Higashi Mizumoto Elementary School (東水元小学校)
- Higashi Shibamata Elementary School (東柴又小学校)
- Hokizuka Elementary School (宝木塚小学校)
- Honden Elementary School (本田小学校)
- Horikiri Elementary School (堀切小学校)
- Hosoda Elementary School (細田小学校)
- Iizuka Elementary School (飯塚小学校)
- Kamakura Elementary School (鎌倉小学校)
- Kameo Elementary School (亀青小学校)
- Kamichiba Elementary School (上千葉小学校)
- Kamihirai Elementary School (上平井小学校)
- Kamikomatsu Elementary School (上小松小学校)
- Kanamachi Elementary School (金町小学校)
- Katsushika Elementary School (葛飾小学校)
- Kawabata Elementary School (川端小学校)
- Kinegawa Elementary School (木根川小学校)
- Kitano Elementary School (北野小学校)
- Koda Elementary School (幸田小学校)
- Komatsuminami Elementary School (小松南小学校)
- Kosuge Elementary School (こすげ小学校)
- Matsukami Elementary School (松上小学校)
- Michiue Elementary School (道上小学校)
- Minami (South) Ayase Elementary School (南綾瀬小学校)
- Minamiokudo Elementary School (南奥戸小学校)
- Mizumoto Elementary School (水元小小学校)
- Naka Aoto Elementary School (中青戸小学校)
- Nakanodai Elementary School (中之台小学校)
- Nichikosuge Elementary School (西小菅小学校)
- Nijuku Elementary School (新宿小学校)
- Nishi (West) Kameari Elementary School (西亀有小学校)
- Okudo Elementary School (奥戸小学校)
- Ryonan Elementary School (綾南小学校)
- Seiwa Elementary School (清和小学校)
- Shibahara Elementary School (柴原小学校)
- Shibamata Elementary School (柴又小学校)
- Shibue Elementary School (渋江小学校)
- Shiratori Elementary School (白鳥小学校)
- Suehiro Elementary School (末広小学校)
- Sumiyoshi Elementary School (住吉小学校)
- Takasogo Elementary School (高砂小学校)
- Umeda Elementary School (梅田小学校)
- Yotsugi Elementary School (よつぎ小学校)

Note that Hota Shiosai Elementary School (保田しおさい学校) is physically located in Kyonan, Awa District, Chiba Prefecture, but it is a municipally-operated school by Katsushika City.

==== Kita ====
- No. 4 Iwabuchi Elementary School (第四岩淵小学校)
- Akabane Elementary School (赤羽小学校)
- Akabanedai Elementary School (赤羽台西小学校)
- Fukuro Elementary School (袋小学校)
- Hachiman Elementary School (八幡小学校)
- Higashi-Jujo Elementary School (東十条小学校)
- Horifune Elementary School (堀船小学校)
- Inada Elementary School (稲田小学校)
- Iwabuchi Elementary School (岩淵小学校)
- Jujo Elementary School (十条小学校)
- Kamiya Elementary School (神谷小学校)
- Kirigaokasato Elementary School (桐ケ丘郷小学校)
- Nadeshiko Elementary School (なでしこ小学校)
- Nishigahara Elementary School (西ケ原小学校)
- Nishigaoka Elementary School (西が丘小学校)
- Nishi Ukima Elementary School (西浮間小学校)
- Oji Elementary School (王子小学校)
- Oji No. 1 Elementary School] (王子第一小学校)
- Oji No. 2 Elementary School] (王子第二小学校)
- Oji No. 3 Elementary School] (王子第三小学校)
- Oji No. 5 Elementary School (王子第五小学校)
- Tabata Elementary School (田端小学校)
- Takinogawa Elementary School (滝野川小学校)
- Takinogawa No. 2 Elementary School (滝野川第二小学校)
- Takinogawa No. 3 Elementary School (滝野川第三小学校)
- Takinogawa No. 4 Elementary School (滝野川第四小学校)
- Takinogawa No. 5 Elementary School (滝野川第五小学校)
- Takinogawa Momiji Elementary School (滝野川もみじ小学校)
- Toshima Wakaba Elementary School (としま若葉小学校)
- Toyokawa Elementary School (豊川小学校)
- Ukima Elementary School (浮間小学校)
- Umenoki Elementary School (梅木小学校)
- Yabata Elementary School (谷端小学校)
- Yanagida Elementary School (柳田小学校)

Former schools:

- No. 3 Iwabuchi Elementary School (第三岩淵小学校)
- Akabanedai Nishi Elementary School (赤羽台西小学校)
- Arakawa Elementary School (荒川小学校)
- Jujodai Elementary School (十条台小学校)
- Momiji Elementary School (紅葉小学校)
- Takinogawa No. 1 Elementary School (滝野川第一小学校)
- Takinogawa No. 6 Elementary School (滝野川第六小学校)
- Takinogawa No. 7 Elementary School (滝野川第七小学校)

==== Koto ====
Combined junior and senior high schools:

- Ariake Nishi Gakuen (有明西学園)

Elementary schools:

- No. 1 Kameido Elementary School (第一亀戸小学校)
- No. 1 Ojima Elementary School (第一大島小学校)
- No. 2 Kameido Elementary School (第二亀戸小学校)
- No. 2 Ojima Elementary School (第二大島小学校)
- No. 2 Sunamachi Elementary School (第二砂町小学校)
- No. 2 Tatsumi Elementary School (第二辰巳小学校)
- No. 3 Ojima Elementary School (第三大島小学校)
- No. 3 Sunamachi Elementary School (第三砂町小学校)
- No. 4 Ojima Elementary School (第四大島小学校)
- No. 4 Sunamachi Elementary School (第四砂町小学校)
- No. 5 Ojima Elementary School (第五大島小学校)
- No. 5 Sunamachi Elementary School (第五砂町小学校)
- No. 6 Sunamachi Elementary School (第六砂町小学校)
- No. 7 Sunamachi Elementary School (第七砂町小学校)
- Ariake Elementary School (有明小学校)
- Edagawa Elementary School (枝川小学校)
- Etchujima Elementary School (越中島小学校)
- Fukagawa Elementary School (深川小学校)
- Heikyu Elementary School (平久小学校)
- Higashisuna Elementary School (東砂小学校)
- Kametaka Elementary School (亀高小学校)
- Katori Elementary School (香取小学校)
- Kazuya Elementary School (数矢小学校)
- Kitasuna Elementary School (北砂小学校)
- Meiji Elementary School (明治小学校)
- Minamisuna Elementary School (南砂小学校)
- Mori Elementary School (毛利小学校)
- Motogaka Elementary School (元加賀小学校)
- Nanyo Elementary School (南陽小学校)
- Ogibashi Elementary School (扇橋小学校)
- Ojima Nan'o Elementary School (大島南央小学校)
- Onagigawa Elementary School (小名木川小学校)
- Rinkai Elementary School (臨海小学校)
- Sengen Tatekawa Elementary School (浅間竪川小学校)
- Sennan Elementary School (川南小学校)
- Shinonome Elementary School (東雲小学校)
- Suijin Elementary School (水神小学校)
- Sunamachi Elementary School (砂町小学校)
- Tatsumi Elementary School (辰巳小学校)
- Tosen Elementary School (東川小学校)
- Toyo Elementary School (東陽小学校)
- Toyosu Elementary School (豊洲小学校)
- Toyosu Kita Elementary School (豊洲北小学校)
- Toyosu Nishi Elementary School (豊洲西小学校)
- Yanagawa Elementary School (八名川小学校)

==== Meguro ====
- Aburamen Elementary School (油面小学校)
- Dendo Elementary School (田道小学校)
- Fudo Elementary School (不動小学校)
- Gekkohara Elementary School (月光原小学校)
- Gohongi Elementary School (五本木小学校)
- Haramachi Elementary School (原町小学校)
- Higashine Elementary School (東根小学校)
- Higashiyama Elementary School (東山小学校)
- Ishibumi Elementary School (碑小学校)
- Kamimeguro Elementary School (上目黒小学校)
- Karasumori Elementary School (烏森小学校)
- Komaba Elementary School (駒場小学校)
- Midorigaoka Elementary School (緑ケ丘小学校)
- Miyamae Elementary School (宮前小学校)
- Mukaihara Elementary School (向原小学校)
- Naka Meguro Elementary School (中目黒小学校)
- Nakane Elementary School (中根小学校)
- Ookayama Elementary School (大岡山小学校)
- Shimomeguro Elementary School (下目黒小学校)
- Sugekari Elementary School (菅刈小学校)
- Takaban Elementary School (鷹番小学校)
- Yakumo Elementary School (八雲小学校)

==== Minato ====
Combined elementary and junior high schools:

- Odaiba Gakuen (お台場学園)
- Shirokane-no-oka Gakuen (白金の丘学園)

Elementary schools:

- Akabane Elementary School (赤羽小学校)
- Akasaka Elementary School (赤坂小学校)
- Aoyama Elementary School (青山小学校)
- Azabu Elementary School (麻布小学校)
- Higashimachi Elementary School (東町小学校)
- Hommura Elementary School (本村小学校)
- Kogai Elementary School (笄小学校)
- Konan Elementary School (港南小学校)
- Mita Elementary School (御田小学校)
- Nanzan Elementary School (南山小学校)
- Onarimon Elementary School (御成門小学校)
- Seinan Elementary School (青南小学校)
- Shiba Elementary School (芝小学校)
- Shibaura Elementary School (芝浦小学校)
- Shibahama Elementary School (芝浜小学校)
- Shirokane Elementary School (白金小学校)
- Takanawadai Elementary School (高輪台小学校) occupies a historic building that had been renovated.

Former schools in Minato:

- Iikura Elementary School (飯倉小学校)
- Koyo Elementary School (港陽小学校)
- Sanko Elementary School (三光小学校)
- Shinno Elementary School (神応小学校)

==== Nakano ====
- Egota Elementary School (江古田小学校)
- Ehara Elementary School (江原小学校)
- Hakuo Elementary School (白桜小学校)
- Heiwa no Mori Elementary School (平和の森小学校)
- Kami Saginomiya Elementary School (上鷺宮小学校)
- Keimei Elementary School (啓明小学校)
- Kitahara Elementary School (北原小学校)
- Midorino Elementary School (緑野小学校)
- Mihato Elementary School (美鳩小学校)
  - Formed by the merger of Wakamiya Elementary (若宮小学校) and Yamato Elementary (大和小学校)
- Minamidai Elementary School (南台小学校)
  - Formed by the merger of Niiyama Elementary (新山小学校) and Tada Elementary (多田小学校)
- Minamino Elementary School (みなみの小学校)
  - Formed by the merger of Nakano Shinmei Elementary (中野神明小学校) and Niiyama Elementary (新山小学校)
- Momozono No. 2 Elementary School (桃園第二小学校)
- Musashidai Elementary School (武蔵台小学校)
- Nakano No. 1 Elementary School (中野第一小学校)
  - Merger of Monozono Elementary School (桃園小学校) and Mukodai Elementary School (向台小学校)
- Nakano Hongo Elementary School (中野本郷小学校)
- Nishi Nakano Elementary School (西中野小学校)
- Reiwa Elementary School (令和小学校)
  - Merger of Arai Elementary School (新井小学校) and Kamitakada Elementary School (上高田小学校)
- Saginomiya Elementary School (鷺宮小学校)
- Toka Elementary School (桃花小学校)
- Tonoyama Elementary School (塔山小学校)
- Yato Elementary School (谷戸小学校)

==== Nerima ====
Nerima City Board of Education operates the following:

Combined elementary and junior high schools:

- Oizumi Sakura Gakuen (小中一貫教育校大泉桜学園)

Elementary schools:

- Asahicho Elementary School (旭町小学校)
- Asahigaoka Elementary School (旭丘小学校)
- Fujimidai Elementary School (富士見台小学校)
- Hashido Elementary School (橋戸小学校)
- Hayamiya Elementary School (早宮小学校)
- Hikarigaoka No. 8 Elementary School (光が丘第八小学校)
- Hikarigaoka Akinohi Elementary School (光が丘秋の陽小学校)
- Hikarigaoka Harunokaze Elementary School (光が丘春の風小学校)
- Hikarigaoka Natsunokumo Elementary School (光が丘夏の雲小学校)
- Hikarigaoka Shikinokaori Elementary School (光が丘四季の香小学校)
- Hokei Elementary School (豊溪小学校)
- Kaishin No. 1 Elementary School (開進第一小学校)
- Kaishin No. 2 Elementary School (開進第二小学校)
- Kaishin No. 3 Elementary School (開進第三小学校)
- Kaishin No. 4 Elementary School (開進第四小学校)
- Kamishakujii Elementary School (上石神井小学校)
- Kamishakujii Kita Elementary School (上石神井北小学校)
- Kasuga Elementary School (春日小学校)
- Kitahara Elementary School (北原小学校)
- Kitamachi Elementary School (北町小学校)
- Kitamachi Nishi Elementary School (北町西小学校)
- Kotake Elementary School (小竹小学校)
- Kowa Elementary School (光和小学校)
- Koyama Elementary School (向山小学校)
- Minamicho Elementary School (南町小学校)
- Minamigaoka Elementary School (南が丘小学校)
- Minami Tanaka Elementary School (南田中小学校)
- Nakamachi Elementary School (仲町小学校)
- Nakamura Elementary School (中村小学校)
- Nakamura Nishi Elementary School (中村西小学校)
- Nerima Elementary School (練馬小学校)
- Nerima No. 2 Elementary School (練馬第二小学校)
- Nerima No. 3 Elementary School (練馬第三小学校)
- Nerima Higashi Elementary School (練馬東小学校)
- Oizumi Elementary School (大泉小学校)
- Oizumi No. 1 Elementary School (大泉第一小学校)
- Oizumi No. 2 Elementary School (大泉第二小学校)
- Oizumi No. 3 Elementary School (大泉第三小学校)
- Oizumi No. 4 Elementary School (大泉第四小学校)
- Oizumi No. 6 Elementary School (大泉第六小学校)
- Oizumi Gakuen Elementary School (大泉学園小学校)
- Oizumi Gakuen Midori Elementary School (大泉学園緑小学校)
- Oizumi Higashi Elementary School (大泉東小学校)
- Oizumi Kita Elementary School (大泉北小学校)
- Oizumi Minami Elementary School (大泉南小学校)
- Oizumi Nishi Elementary School (大泉西小学校)
- Sekimachi Elementary School (関町小学校)
- Sekimachi Kita Elementary School (関町北小学校)
- Senshin Elementary School (泉新小学校)
- Shakujii Elementary School (石神井小学校)
- Shakujiidai Elementary School (石神井台小学校)
- Shakujii Higashi Elementary School (石神井東小学校)
- Shakujii Nishi Elementary School (石神井西小学校)
- Shimo Shakujii Elementary School (下石神井小学校)
- Tagara Elementary School (田柄小学校)
- Tagara No. 2 Elementary School (田柄第二小学校)
- Takamatsu Elementary School (高松小学校)
- Tateno Elementary School (立野小学校)
- Toyotama Elementary School (豊玉小学校)
- Toyotama No. 2 Elementary School (豊玉第二小学校)
- Toyotama Higashi Elementary School (豊玉東小学校)
- Toyotama Minami Elementary School (豊玉南小学校)
- Yasaka Elementary School (八坂小学校)
- Yawara Elementary School (谷原小学校)

==== Ota ====
Municipal elementary schools:

- Aioi Elementary School (相生小学校)
- Akamatsu Elementary School (赤松小学校)
- Chidori Elementary School (千鳥小学校)
- Chisetsu Elementary School (池雪小学校)
- Chofu Otsuka Elementary School (調布大塚小学校)
- Den en Chofu Elementary School (田園調布小学校)
- Haginaka Elementary School (萩中小学校)
- Haneda Elementary School (羽田小学校)
- Higashi Chofu No. 1 Elementary School (東調布第一小学校)
- Higashi Chofu No. 3 Elementary School (東調布第三小学校)
- Higashi Kojiya Elementary School (東糀谷小学校)
- Higashi Rokugo Elementary School (東六郷小学校)
- Ikegami Elementary School (池上小学校)
- Ikegami No. 2 Elementary School (池上第二小学校)
- Iriarai No. 1 Elementary School (入新井第一小学校)
- Iriarai No. 2 Elementary School (入新井第二小学校)
- Iriarai No. 4 Elementary School (入新井第四小学校)
- Iriarai No. 5 Elementary School (入新井第五小学校)
- Izumo Elementary School (出雲小学校)
- Kaio Elementary School (開桜小学校)
- Kamata Elementary School (蒲田小学校)
- Kita Kojiya Elementary School (北糀谷小学校)
- Koike Elementary School (小池小学校)
- Kojiya Elementary School (糀谷小学校)
- Kugahara Elementary School (久原小学校)
- Magome Elementary School (馬込小学校)
- Magome No. 2 Elementary School (馬込第二小学校)
- Magome No. 3 Elementary School (馬込第三小学校)
- Michizuka Elementary School (道塚小学校)
- Minami Rokugo Elementary School (南六郷小学校)
- Minemachi Elementary School (嶺町小学校)
- Nakahaginaka Elementary School (中萩中小学校)
- Nakarokugo Elementary School (仲六郷小学校)
- Nakatomi Elementary School (中富小学校)
- Nanpo Elementary School (南蒲小学校)
- Nishi Rokugo Elementary School (西六郷小学校)
- Omori No. 1 Elementary School (大森第一小学校)
- Omori No. 3 Elementary School (大森第三小学校)
- Omori No. 4 Elementary School (大森第四小学校)
- Omori No. 5 Elementary School (大森第五小学校)
- Omori Higashi Elementary School (大森東小学校)
- Onazuka Elementary School (おなづか小学校)
- Rokugo Elementary School (六郷小学校)
- Sanno Elementary School (山王小学校)
- Senzokuike Elementary School (洗足池小学校)
- Shimizukubo Elementary School (清水窪小学校)
- Shimoda Elementary School (志茂田小学校)
- Shinshuku Elementary School (新宿小学校)
- Shosen Elementary School (松仙小学校)
- Takahata Elementary School (高畑小学校)
- Tamagawa Elementary School (多摩川小学校)
- Toho Elementary School (東蒲小学校)
- Tokumochi Elementary School (徳持小学校)
- Tonan Elementary School (都南小学校)
- Umeda Elementary School (梅田小学校)
- Yaguchi Elementary School (矢口小学校)
- Yaguchi Higashi Elementary School (矢口東小学校)
- Yaguchi Nishi Elementary School (矢口西小学校)
- Yukigaya Elementary School (雪谷小学校)

==== Setagaya ====
- Akazutsumi Elementary School (赤堤小学校)
- Asahi Elementary School (旭小学校)
- Chitose Elementary School (千歳小学校)
- Chitosedai Elementary School (千歳台小学校)
- Daita Elementary School (代田小学校)
- Daizawa Elementary School (代沢小学校)
- Fukasawa Elementary School (深沢小学校)
- Funabashi Elementary School (船橋小学校)
- Futako Tamagawa Elementary School (二子玉川小学校)
- Hachimanyama Elementary School (八幡山小学校)
- Higashi Fukasawa Elementary School (東深沢小学校)
- Higashi Tamagawa Elementary School (東玉川小学校)
- Kamikitazawa Elementary School (上北沢小学校)]
- Karasuyama Elementary School (烏山小学校)
- Karasuyama Kita Elementary School (烏山北小学校)
- Kibogaoka Elementary School (希望丘小学校)
- Kinuta Elementary School (砧小学校)
- Kinuta Minami Elementary School (砧南小学校)
- Kitami Elementary School (喜多見小学校)
- Komatsunagi Elementary School (駒繋小学校)
- Komazawa Elementary School (駒沢小学校)
- Kuhonbutsu Elementary School (九品仏小学校)
- Kyodo Elementary School (経堂小学校)
- Kyosai Elementary School (京西小学校)
- Kyuden Elementary School (給田小学校)
- Ikejiri Elementary School (池尻小学校)
- Ikenoue Elementary School (池之上小学校)
- Matsubara Elementary School (松原小学校)
- Matsugaoka Elementary School (松丘小学校)
- Matsuzawa Elementary School (松沢小学校)
- Meisei Elementary School (明正小学校)
- Mishuku Elementary School (三宿小学校)
- Musashigaoka Elementary School (武蔵丘小学校)
- Nakamachi Elementary School (中町小学校)
- Nakamaru Elementary School (中丸小学校)
- Nakazato Elementary School (中里小学校)
- Okusawa Elementary School (奥沢小学校)
- Oyamadai Elementary School (尾山台小学校)
- Roka Elementary School (芦花小学校)
- Sakura Elementary School (桜小学校)
- Sakuragaoka Elementary School (桜丘小学校)
- Sakuramachi Elementary School (桜町小学校)
- Sangenjaya Elementary School (三軒茶屋小学校)
- Sasahara Elementary School (笹原小学校)
- Seta Elementary School (瀬田小学校)
- Setagaya Elementary School (世田谷小学校)
- Shimokitazawa Elementary School (下北沢小学校)
- Shiroyama Elementary School (城山小学校)
- Soshigaya Elementary School (祖師谷小学校)
- Taishido Elementary School (太子堂小学校)
- Tamagawa Elementary School (玉川小学校)
- Tamazutsumi Elementary School (玉堤小学校)
- Tamon Elementary School (多聞小学校)
- Todoroki Elementary School (等々力小学校)
- Tsukado Elementary School (塚戸小学校)
- Tsurumaki Elementary School (弦巻小学校)
- Wakabayashi Elementary School (若林小学校)
- Yahata Elementary School (八幡小学校)
- Yamazaki Elementary School (山崎小学校)
- Yamano Elementary School (山野小学校)
- Yoga Elementary School (用賀小学校)

Former schools:

- Hanamido Elementary School (花見堂小学校)
- Higashi Ohara Elementary School (東大原小学校)
- Kitazawa Elementary School (北沢小学校)
- Moriyama Elementary School (守山小学校)

==== Shibuya ====
Public combined elementary and junior high schools

- Shibuya Honmachi Gakuen (渋谷本町学園)

Elementary schools:

- Hatashiro Elementary School (幡代小学校)
- Hatomori Elementary School (鳩森小学校)
- Hiroo Elementary School (広尾小学校)
- Jingumae Elementary School (神宮前小学校)
- Jinnan Elementary School (神南小学校)
- Kakezuka Elementary School (加計塚小学校)
- Nagayato Elementary School (長谷戸小学校)
- Nakahata Elementary School (中幡小学校)
- Nishihara Elementary School (西原小学校)
- Rinsen Elementary School (臨川小学校)
- Sarugaku Elementary School (猿楽小学校)
- Sasazuka Elementary School (笹塚小学校)
- Sendagaya Elementary School (千駄谷小学校)
- Tokiwamatsu Elementary School (常磐松小学校)
- Tomigaya Elementary School (富谷小学校)
- Uehara Elementary School (上原小学校)
- Yoyogisanya Elementary School (代々木山谷小学校)

==== Shinagawa ====
Municipal combined elementary and junior high schools:

- Ebara Hiratsuka Gakuen (荏原平塚学園)
- Hino Gakuen (日野学園)
- Houyou no Mori Gakuen (豊葉の杜学園)
- Ito Gakuen (伊藤学園)
- Shinagawa Gakuen (品川学園)
- Yashio Gakuen (八潮学園)

Municipal elementary schools:

- No. 2 Enzan Elementary School (第二延山小学校)
- No. 1 Hino Elementary School (第一日野小学校)
- No. 3 Hino Elementary School (第三日野小学校)
- No. 4 Hino Elementary School (第四日野小学校)
- Asamadai Elementary School (浅間台小学校)
- Daiba Elementary School (台場小学校)
- Enzan Elementary School (延山小学校)
- Genjimae Elementary School (源氏前小学校)
- Gotenyama Elementary School (御殿山小学校)
- Hamakawa Elementary School (浜川小学校)
- Hatanodai Elementary School (旗台小学校)
- Hosui Elementary School (芳水小学校)
- Ito Elementary School (伊藤小学校)
- Jonan Elementary School (城南小学校)
- Jonan No. 2 Elementary School (城南第二小学校)
- Kamishinmei Elementary School (上神明小学校)
- Keiyo Elementary School (京陽小学校)
- Koyama Elementary School (小山小学校)
- Koyamadai Elementary School (小山台小学校)
- Mitsugi Elementary School (三木小学校)
- Miyamae Elementary School (宮前小学校)
- Nakanobu Elementary School (中延小学校)
- Ohara Elementary School (大原小学校)
- Oi No. 1 Elementary School (大井第一小学校)
- Samehama Elementary School (鮫浜小学校)
- Shimizudai Elementary School (清水台小学校)
- Suzugamori Elementary School (鈴ヶ森小学校)
- Tachiai Elementary School (立会小学校)
- Togoshi Elementary School (戸越小学校)
- Ushiroji Elementary School (後地小学校)
- Yamanaka Elementary School (山中小学校)

==== Shinjuku ====
- Aijitsu Elementary School (愛日小学校)
- Edogawa Elementary School (江戸川小学校)
- Hanazono Elementary School (花園小学校)
- Higashitoyama Elementary School (東戸山小学校)
- Ichigaya Elementary School (市谷小学校)
- Kashiwagi Elementary School (柏木小学校)
- Nishi-Shinjuku Elementary School (西新宿小学校)
- Nishi-Toyama Elementary School (西戸山小学校)
- Ochiai Daiichi (No. 1) Elementary School (落合第一小学校)
- Ochiai Daini (No. 2) Elementary School (落合第二小学校)
- Ochiai Daisan (No. 3) Elementary School (落合第三小学校)
- Ochiai Daiyon (No. 4) Elementary School (落合第四小学校)
- Ochiai Daigo (No. 5) Elementary School (落合第五小学校)
- Ochiai Dairoku (No. 6) Elementary School (落合第六小学校)
- Ōkubo Elementary School (大久保小学校)
- Tenjin Elementary School (天神小学校)
- Tomihisa Elementary School (富久小学校)
- Totsuka Daiichi Elementary School (戸塚第一小学校)
- Totsuka Daini Elementary School (戸塚第二小学校)
- Totsuka Daisan Elementary School (戸塚第三小学校)
- Toyama Elementary School (戸山小学校)
- Tsukudo Elementary School (津久戸小学校)
- Tsurumaki Elementary School (鶴巻小学校)
- Ushigome-Nakano Elementary School (牛込仲之小学校)
- Waseda Elementary School (早稲田小学校)
- Yochomachi Elementary School (余丁町小学校)
- Yodobashi No. 4 Elementary School (淀橋第四小学校)
- Yotsuya Elementary School (四谷小学校)
- Yotsuya Dairoku (No. 6) Elementary School (四谷第六小学校)

Former schools:

- Yotsuya No. 1 Elementary School (四谷第一小学校) - Merged into Yotsuya Elementary in 2007 (Heisei 19)
- Yotsuya No. 3 Elementary School (四谷第三小学校) - Merged into Yotsuya Elementary in 2007
- Yotsuya No. 4 Elementary School (四谷第四小学校) - Merged into Yotsuya Elementary in 2007

==== Suginami ====
Municipal combined elementary and junior high schools:

- Koenji Gakuen (高円寺学園)
- Suginami Izumi Gakuen (杉並和泉学園)

Municipal elementary schools:

- Amanuma (天沼小学校)
- Eifuku (永福小学校)
- Fujimigaoka (富士見丘小学校)
- Hachinari (八成小学校)
- Hamadayama (浜田山小学校)
- Higashita (東田小学校)
- Honan (方南小学校)
- Horinouchi (堀之内小学校)
- Iogi (井荻小学校)
- Kugayama (久我山小学校)
- Kutsukake (沓掛小学校)
- Mabashi (馬橋小学校)
- Matsunoki (松ノ木小学校)
- Momoi No. 1 (桃井第一小学校)
- Momoi No. 2 (桃井第二小学校)
- Momoi No. 3 (桃井第三小学校)
- Momoi No. 4 (桃井第四小学校)
- Momoi No. 5 (桃井第五小学校)
- Nishita (西田小学校)
- Ogikubo (荻窪小学校)
- Omiya (大宮小学校)
- Sanya (三谷小学校)
- Seibi (済美小学校)
- Shinomiya (四宮小学校)
- Shoan (松庵小学校)
- Suginami No. 1 (杉並第一小学校)
- Suginami No. 2 (杉並第ニ小学校)
- Suginami No. 3 (杉並第三小学校)
- Suginami No. 6 (杉並第六小学校)
- Suginami No. 7 (杉並第七小学校)
- Suginami No. 9 (杉並第九小学校)
- Suginami No. 10 (杉並第十小学校)
- Takaido (高井戸小学校)
- Takaido No. 2 (高井戸第二小学校)
- Takaido No. 3 (高井戸第三小学校)
- Takaido No. 4 (高井戸第四小学校)
- Takaido Higashi (高井戸東小学校)
- Wada (和田小学校)

==== Sumida ====
Municipal elementary schools are operated by Sumida City Board of Education (墨田区教育委員会).

- No. 1 Terajima (第一寺島小学校)
- No. 2 Terajima (第二寺島小学校)
- No. 3 Azuma (第三吾嬬小学校)
- No. 3 Terajima (第三寺島小学校)
- No. 4 Azuma (第四吾嬬小学校)
- Chuwa (中和小学校)
- Futaba (二葉小学校)
- Higashiazuma (東吾嬬小学校)
- Hikifune (曳舟小学校)
- Kikukawa (菊川小学校)
- Kinshi (錦糸小学校)
- Kototoi (言問小学校)
- Koume (小梅小学校)
- Midori (緑小学校)
- Nakagawa (中川小学校)
- Narihira (業平小学校)
- Oshiage (押上小学校)
- Ryogoku (両国小学校)
- Sotode (外手小学校)
- Sumida (隅田小学校)
- Tachibana Azuma-no-Mori (立花吾嬬の森小学校)
- Umekawa (梅若小学校)
- Yahiro (八広小学校)
- Yanagashima (柳島小学校)
- Yokokawa (横川小学校)

==== Taito ====
- Asakusa Elementary School (浅草小学校)
- Fuji Elementary School (富士小学校)
- Heisei Elementary School (平成小学校)
- Higashi Asakusa Elementary School (東浅草小学校)
- Ishihama Elementary School (石浜小学校)
- Kanasogi Elementary School (金曽木小学校)
- Kinryu Elementary School (金竜小学校)
- Kuramae Elementary School (蔵前小学校)
- Kuromon Elementary School (黒門小学校)
- Matsuba Elementary School (松葉小学校)
- Negishi Elementary School (根岸小学校)
- Senzoku Elementary School (千束小学校)
- Shinobugaoka Elementary School (忍岡小学校)
- Taisho Elementary School (大正小学校)
- Taito Ikuei Elementary School (台東育英小学校)
- Tawara Elementary School (田原小学校)
- Tosen Elementary School (東泉小学校)
- Ueno Elementary School (上野小学校)
- Yanaka Elementary School (谷中小学校)

==== Toshima ====
- Asahi Elementary School (朝日小学校)
- Chihaya Elementary School (千早小学校)
- Fujimidai Elementary School (富士見台小学校)
- Gyoko Elementary School (仰高小学校)
- Hosei Elementary School (豊成小学校)
- Hoyu Elementary School (朋有小学校)
- Ikebukuro Elementary School (池袋小学校)
- Ikebukuro Daiichi (No. 1) Elementary School (池袋第一小学校)
- Ikebukuro Daisan (No. 3) Elementary School (池袋第三小学校)
- Ikebukuro Honcho Elementary School (池袋本町小学校)
- Kaname Elementary School (要小学校)
- Komagome Elementary School (駒込小学校)
- Konan Elementary School (高南小学校)
- Mejiro Elementary School (目白小学校)
- Minami Ikebukuro Elementary School (南池袋小学校)
- Nagasaki Elementary School (長崎小学校)
- Nishisugamo Elementary School (西巣鴨小学校)
- Sakura Elementary School (さくら小学校)
- Seiwa Elementary School (清和小学校)
- Shiinamachi Elementary School (椎名町小学校)
- Sugamo Elementary School (巣鴨小学校)
- Takamatsu Elementary School (高松小学校)

=== West Tokyo ===
==== Akiruno ====
- Higashi Akiru (東秋留小学校)
- Ichinotani (一の谷小学校)
- Itsukaichi (五日市小学校)
- Kusahana (草花小学校)
- Maeda (前田小学校)
- Masuko (増戸小学校)
- Minami Akiru (南秋留小学校)
- Nishi Akiru (西秋留小学校)
- Tasai (多西小学校)
- Yashiro (屋城小学校)

==== Akishima ====
- Azuma Elementary School (東小学校)
- Fujimigaoka Elementary School (富士見丘小学校)
- Hajima No. 1 Elementary School (拝島第一小学校)
- Hajima No. 2 Elementary School (拝島第二小学校)
- Hajima No. 3 Elementary School (拝島第三小学校)
- Koka Elementary School (光華小学校)
- Kyosei Elementary School (共成小学校)
- Musashino Elementary School (武蔵野小学校)
- Nakagami Elementary School (中神小学校)
- Seirin Elementary School (成隣小学校)
- Tamagawa Elementary School (玉川小学校)
- Tanaka Elementary School (田中小学校)
- Tsutsuji Gaoka Elementary School (つつじが丘小学校)

Former schools:

- Hajima No. 4 Elementary School (拝島第四小学校) - Merged into Hajima No. 1 in 2015 (Heisei 27)
- Tsutsuji Gaoka Kita Elementary School (つつじが丘北小学校) - Merged into Tsutsuji Gaoka in 2016 (Heisei 28)
- Tsutsuji Gaoka Minami Elementary School (つつじが丘南小学校) - Merged into Tsutsuji Gaoka in 2016 (Heisei 28)

==== Chofu ====
Municipal elementary schools:

- No. 1 Elementary School (第一小学校)
- No. 2 Elementary School (第二小学校)
- No. 3 Elementary School (第三小学校)
- Chowa Elementary School (調和小学校)
- Fuda Elementary School (布田小学校)
- Fujimidai Elementary School (富士見台小学校)
- Ishiwara Elementary School (石原小学校)
- Jindaiji Elementary School (深大寺小学校)
- Kashiwano Elementary School (柏野小学校)
- Kitanodai Elementary School (北ノ台小学校)
- Kokuryo Elementary School (国領小学校)
- Midorigaoka Elementary School (緑ヶ丘小学校)
- Somechi Elementary School (染地小学校)
- Sugimori Elementary School (杉森小学校)
- Takizaka Elementary School (滝坂小学校)
- Tamagawa Elementary School (多摩川小学校)
- Tobitakyu Elementary School (飛田給小学校)
- Uenohara Elementary School (上ノ原小学校)
- Wakaba Elementary School (若葉小学校)
- Yakumodai Elementary School (八雲台小学校)

==== Fuchu ====
- Fuchu No. 1 (府中第一小学校)
- Fuchu No. 2 (府中第二小学校)
- Fuchu No. 3 (府中第三小学校)
- Fuchu No. 4 (府中第四小学校)
- Fuchu No. 5 (府中第五小学校)
- Fuchu No. 6 (府中第六小学校)
- Fuchu No. 7 (府中第七小学校)
- Fuchu No. 8 (府中第八小学校)
- Fuchu No. 9 (府中第九小学校)
- Fuchu No. 10 (府中第十小学校)
- Honshuku (本宿小学校)
- Koyanagi (小柳小学校)
- Minamicho (南町小学校)
- Minami Shiraitodai (南白糸台小学校)
- Musashidai (武蔵台小学校)
- Nisshin (日新小学校)
- Shimmachi (新町小学校)
- Shiraitodai (白糸台小学校)
- Sumiyoshi (住吉小学校)
- Wakamatsu (若松小学校)
- Yazaki (矢崎小学校)
- Yotsuya (四谷小学校)

==== Fussa ====
- Fussa No. 1 (福生第一小学校)
- Fussa No. 2 (福生第二小学校)
- Fussa No. 3 (福生第三小学校)
- Fussa No. 4 (福生第四小学校)
- Fussa No. 5 (福生第五小学校)
- Fussa No. 6 (福生第六小学校)
- Fussa No. 7 (福生第七小学校)

==== Hachioji ====
Combined public elementary and junior high schools:

- Izumi no Mori School (いずみの森義務教育学校)
- Tate (館小中学校)

Elementary schools:

- No. 1 (第一小学校)
- No. 2 (第二小学校)
- No. 3 (第三小学校)
- No. 4 (第四小学校)
- No. 5 (第五小学校)
- No. 7 (第七小学校)
- No. 8 (第八小学校)
- No. 9 (第九小学校)
- No. 10 (第十小学校)
- Akibadai (秋葉台小学校)
- Asakawa (浅川小学校)
- Atago (愛宕小学校)
- Bessho (別所小学校)
- Funeda (船田小学校)
- Higashi Asakawa (東浅川小学校)
- Kami Ichibukata (上壱分方小学校)
- Kami Kawaguchi (上川口小学校)
- Kami Yugi (上柚木小学校)
- Kashima (鹿島小学校)
- Kashiwagi (柏木小学校)
- Kasumi (加住小学校)
- Katakuradai (片倉台小学校)
- Kawaguchi (川口小学校)
- Komiya (小宮小学校)
- Kunugida (椚田小学校)
- Nagaike (長池小学校)
- Matsugaya (松が谷小学校)
- Matsugi (松木小学校)
- Midorigaoka (緑が丘小学校)
- Minamino (みなみ野小学校)
- Minamino Kimita (みなみ野君田小学校)
- Minami Osawa (南大沢小学校)
- Miyakami (宮上小学校)
- Miyama (美山小学校)
- Moto Hachioji (元八王子小学校)
- Moto Hachioji Higashi (元八王子東小学校)
- Motoki (元木小学校)
- Nagabusa (長房小学校)
- Naganuma (長沼小学校)
- Nakano Kita (中野北小学校)
- Nakayama (中山小学校)
- Nanakuni (七国小学校)
- Narahara (楢原小学校)
- Matsue (松枝小学校)
- Nibukata (弐分方小学校)
- Ongata No. 1 (恩方第一小学校)
- Ongata No. 2 (恩方第二小学校)
- Owada (大和田小学校)
- Sanda (散田小学校)
- Shimizu (清水小学校)
- Shimo Yugi (下柚木小学校)
- Shiroyama (城山小学校)
- Takakura (高倉小学校)
- Takane (高嶺小学校)
- Toyo (陶鎔小学校)
- Utsukidai (宇津木台小学校)
- Yamada (山田小学校)
- Yarimizu (鑓水小学校)
- Yokokawa (横川小学校)
- Yokoyama No. 1 (横山第一小学校)
- Yokoyama No. 2 (横山第二小学校)
- Yugi Chuo (由木中央小学校)
- Yugi Higashi (由木東小学校)
- Yugi Nishi (由木西小学校)
- Yui No. 1 (由井第一小学校)
- Yui No. 2 (由井第二小学校)
- Yui No. 3 (由井第三小学校)

Former:

- Takaosan Gakuen (高尾山学園) - Elementary and junior high

==== Hamura ====
- Fujimi (富士見小学校)
- Hamura Higashi (羽村東小学校)
- Hamura Nishi (羽村西小学校)
- Musashino (武蔵野小学校)
- Ozakudai (小作台小学校)
- Sakae (栄小学校)
- Shorin (松林小学校)

==== Higashikurume ====
- No. 1 (第一小学校)
- No. 2 (第二小学校)
- No. 3 (第三小学校)
- No. 5 (第五小学校)
- No. 6 (第六小学校)
- No. 7 (第七小学校)
- No. 9 (第九小学校)
- Hommura (本村小学校)
- Koyama (小山小学校)
- Minamimachi (南町小学校)
- Shinho (神宝小学校)

==== Higashimurayama ====
- Akitsu (秋津小学校)
- Akitsu Higashi (秋津東小学校)
- Aoba (青葉小学校)
- Fujimi (富士見小学校)
- Hagiyama (萩山小学校)
- Higashi Hagiyama (東萩山小学校)
- Kasei (化成小学校)
- Kitayama (北山小学校)
- Kumegawa (久米川小学校)
- Kumegawa Higashi (久米川東小学校)
- Megurita (回田小学校)
- Minamidai (南台小学校)
- Nobidome (野火止小学校)
- Onta (大岱小学校)
- Yasaka (八坂小学校)

==== Higashiyamato ====
- No. 1 (第一小学校)
- No. 2 (第二小学校)
- No. 3 (第三小学校)
- No. 4 (第四小学校)
- No. 5 (第五小学校)
- No. 6 (第六小学校)
- No. 7 (第七小学校)
- No. 8 (第八小学校)
- No. 9 (第九小学校)
- No. 10 (第十小学校)

==== Hino ====
- Asahigaoka (旭が丘小学校)
- Hino No. 1 (日野第一小学校)
- Hino No. 3 (日野第三小学校)
- Hino No. 4 (日野第四小学校)
- Hino No. 5 (日野第五小学校)
- Hino No. 6 (日野第六小学校)
- Hino No. 7 (日野第七小学校)
- Hino No. 8 (日野第八小学校)
- Hirayama (平山小学校)
- Juntoku (潤徳小学校)
- Minamidaira (南平小学校)
- Nakada (仲田小学校)
- Nanaomidori (七生緑小学校)
- Takiai (滝合小学校)
- Tokoji (東光寺小学校)
- Toyoda (豊田小学校)
- Yumeagaoka (夢が丘小学校)

==== Hinode ====
- Hirai Elementary School (平井小学校)
- Honjuku Elementary School (本宿小学校)
- Oguno Elementary School (大久野小学校)

==== Hinohara ====
- Hinohara Elementary School (檜原小学校)

==== Inagi ====
- Hirao (平尾小学校)
- Inagi No. 1 (稲城第一小学校)
- Inagi No. 2 (稲城第二小学校)
- Inagi No. 3 (稲城第三小学校)
- Inagi No. 4 (稲城第四小学校)
- Inagi No. 6 (稲城第六小学校)
- Inagi No. 7 (稲城第七小学校)
- Koyodai (向陽台小学校)
- Minamiyama (南山小学校)
- Nagamine (長峰小学校)
- Shiroyama (城山小学校)
- Wakabadai (若葉台小学校)

==== Kiyose ====
- Kiyose (清瀬小学校)
- Kiyose No. 3 (清瀬第三小学校)
- Kiyose No. 4 (清瀬第四小学校)
- Kiyose No. 6 (清瀬第六小学校)
- Kiyose No. 7 (清瀬第七小学校)
- Kiyose No. 8 (清瀬第八小学校)
- Kiyose No. 10 (清瀬第十小学校)
- Seimei (清明小学校)
- Shibayama (芝山小学校)

==== Kodaira ====
- Gakuen Higashi (学園東小学校)
- Hana Koganei (花小金井小学校)
- Kamijuku (上宿小学校)
- Kodaira No. 1 (小平第一小学校)
- Kodaira No. 2 (小平第二小学校)
- Kodaira No. 3 (小平第三小学校)
- Kodaira No. 4 (小平第四小学校)
- Kodaira No. 5 (小平第五小学校)
- Kodaira No. 6 (小平第六小学校)
- Kodaira No. 7 (小平第七小学校)
- Kodaira No. 8 (小平第八小学校)
- Kodaira No. 9 (小平第九小学校)
- Kodaira No. 10 (小平第十小学校)
- Kodaira No. 11 (小平第十一小学校)
- Kodaira No. 12 (小平第十二小学校)
- Kodaira No. 13 (小平第十三小学校)
- Kodaira No. 14 (小平第十四小学校)
- Kodaira No. 15 (小平第十五小学校)
- Suzuki (鈴木小学校)

==== Koganei ====
- Higashi (東小学校)
- Honcho (本町小学校)
- Koganei No. 1 (小金井第一小学校)
- Koganei No. 2 (小金井第二小学校)
- Koganei No. 3 (小金井第三小学校)
- Koganei No. 4 (小金井第四小学校)
- Maehara (前原小学校)
- Midori (緑小学校)
- Minami (南小学校)

==== Kokubunji ====
- No. 1 (第一小学校)
- No. 2 (第二小学校)
- No. 3 (第三小学校)
- No. 4 (第四小学校)
- No. 5 (第五小学校)
- No. 6 (第六小学校)
- No. 7 (第七小学校)
- No. 8 (第八小学校)
- No. 9 (第九小学校)
- No. 10 (第十小学校)

==== Komae ====
Public elementary schools:

- Izumi (和泉小学校)
- Komae No. 1 (狛江第一小学校)
- Komae No. 3 (狛江第三小学校)
- Komae No. 5 (狛江第五小学校)
- Komae No. 6 (狛江第六小学校)
- Midorino (緑野小学校)

==== Kunitachi ====
- Kunitachi No. 1 (国立第一小学校)
- Kunitachi No. 2 (国立第二小学校)
- Kunitachi No. 3 (国立第三小学校)
- Kunitachi No. 4 (国立第四小学校)
- Kunitachi No. 5 (国立第五小学校)
- Kunitachi No. 6 (国立第六小学校)
- Kunitachi No. 7 (国立第七小学校)
- Kunitachi No. 8 (国立第八小学校)

==== Machida ====
Combined municipal elementary and junior high schools:

- Yukinoki Gakuen (ゆくのき学園) - For elementary, it occupies Oto Elementary (大戸小学校).

Municipal elementary schools:

- Aihara (相原小学校)
- Fujinodai (藤の台小学校)
- Honmachida (本町田小学校)
- Honmachida Higashi (本町田東小学校)
- Kanai (金井小学校)
- Kiso Sakaigawa (木曽境川小学校)
- Machida No. 1 (町田第一小学校)
- Machida No. 2 (町田第二小学校)
- Machida No. 3 (町田第三小学校)
- Machida No. 4 (町田第四小学校)
- Machida No. 5 (町田第五小学校)
- Machida No. 6 (町田第六小学校)
- Minami No. 1 (南第一小学校)
- Minami No. 2 (南第二小学校)
- Minami No. 3 (南第三小学校)
- Minami No. 4 (南第四小学校)
- Minaminaruse (南成瀬小学校)
- Minamioya (南大谷小学校)
- Minami Tsukushino (南つくし野小学校)
- Miwa (三輪小学校)
- Nanakuniyama (七国山小学校)
- Naruse Chuo (成瀬中央小学校)
- Narusedai (成瀬台小学校)
- Ogawa (小川小学校)
- Okura (大蔵小学校)
- Oyama (小山小学校)
- Oyama Chuo (小山中央小学校)
- Oyamada (小山田小学校)
- Oyamada Minami (小山田南小学校)
- Oyama Gaoka (小山ヶ丘小学校)
- Tadao (忠生小学校)
- Tadao No. 3 (忠生第三小学校)
- Takagasaka (高ヶ坂小学校)
- Tsukushino (つくし野小学校)
- Tsurukawa No. 1 (鶴川第一小学校)
- Tsurukawa No. 2 (鶴川第二小学校)
- Tsurukawa No. 3 (鶴川第三小学校)
- Tsurukawa No. 4 (鶴川第四小学校)
- Tsuruma (鶴間小学校)
- Yamazaki (山崎小学校)
- Zushi (図師小学校)

==== Mitaka ====
- No. 1 (第一小学校)
- No. 2 (第二小学校)
- No. 3 (第三小学校)
- No. 4 (第四小学校)
- No. 5 (第五小学校)
- No. 6 (第六小学校)
- No. 7 (第七小学校)
- Hanesawa (羽沢小学校)
- Higashidai (東台小学校)
- Iguchi (井口小学校)
- Kitano (北野小学校)
- Minamiura (南浦小学校)
- Nakahara (中原小学校)
- Osawadai (大沢台小学校)
- Takayama (高山小学校)

==== Mizuho ====
- Mizuho 1st Elementary School (瑞穂第一小学校)
- Mizuho 2nd Elementary School (瑞穂第二小学校)
- Mizuho 3rd Elementary School (瑞穂第三小学校)
- Mizuho 4th Elementary School (瑞穂第四小学校)
- Mizuho 5th Elementary School (瑞穂第五小学校)

==== Musashimurayama ====
Municipal combined elementary and junior high schools:

- Dainan Gakuen (大南学園) - No. 7 Elementary School (第七小学校) and No. 4 Junior High School (第四中学校)
- Murayama Gakuen (村山学園)

Municipal elementary schools:

- No. 1 (第一小学校)
- No. 2 (第二小学校)
- No. 3 (第三小学校)
- No. 8 (第八小学校)
- No. 9 (第九小学校)
- No. 10 (第十小学校)
- Raizuka (雷塚小学校)

==== Musashino ====
- No. 1 Elementary School (第一小学校)
- No. 2 Elementary School (第二小学校)
- No. 3 Elementary School (第三小学校)
- No. 4 Elementary School (第四小学校)
- No. 5 Elementary School (第五小学校)
- Honjuku Elementary School (本宿小学校)
- Inokashira Elementary School (井之頭小学校)
- Kyonan Elementary School (境南小学校)
- Onoden Elementary School (大野田小学校)
- Sakurano Elementary School (桜野小学校)
- Sekimae Minami Elementary School (関前南小学校)
- Senkawa Elementary School (千川小学校)

==== Nishitokyo ====
- Hekizan (碧山小学校)
- Higashi (東小学校)
- Higashi Fushimi (東伏見小学校)
- Honcho (本町小学校)
- Houya (保谷小学校)
- Houya No. 1 (保谷第一小学校)
- Houya No. 2 (保谷第二小学校)
- Kami Mukodai (上向台小学校)
- Keyaki (けやき小学校)
- Mukodai (向台小学校)
- Nakahara (中原小学校)
- Sakae (栄小学校)
- Shibakubo (芝久保小学校)
- Sumiyoshi (住吉小学校)
- Tanashi
- Yagisawa (柳沢小学校)
- Yato (谷戸小学校)
- Yato No. 2 (谷戸第二小学校)

==== Okutama ====
- Hikawa Elementary School (氷川小学校)
- Kori Elementary School (古里小学校)

==== Ome ====
- No. 1 (第一小学校)
- No. 2 (第二小学校)
- No. 3 (第三小学校)
- No. 4 (第四小学校)
- No. 5 (第五小学校)
- No. 6 (第六小学校)
- No. 7 (第七小学校)
- Fujihashi (藤橋小学校)
- Fukiage (吹上小学校)
- Higashi ("East") (東小学校)
- Imai (今井小学校)
- Kabe (河辺小学校)
- Kasumidai (霞台小学校)
- Nariki (成木小学校)
- Shinmachi (新町小学校)
- Tomoda (友田小学校)
- Wakakusa (若草小学校)

==== Tachikawa ====
- Tachikawa Daiichi (No. 1) Elementary School (第一小学校)
- No. 2 Elementary School (第二小学校)
- No. 3 Elementary School (第三小学校)
- No. 4 Elementary School (第四小学校)
- No. 5 Elementary School (第五小学校)
- No. 6 Elementary School (第六小学校)
- No. 7 Elementary School (第七小学校)
- No. 8 Elementary School (第八小学校)
- No. 9 Elementary School (第九小学校)
- No. 10 Elementary School (第十小学校)
- Kamisunagawa Elementary School (上砂川小学校)
- Kashiwa Elementary School (柏小学校)
- Matsunaka Elementary School (松中小学校)
- Minamisuna Elementary School (南砂小学校)
- Nishisuna Elementary School (西砂小学校)
- Oyama Elementary School (大山小学校)
- Saiwai Elementary School (幸小学校)
- Shinsei Elementary School (新生小学校)
- Wakabadai Elementary School (若葉台小学校)

==== Tama ====
- Aiwa (愛和小学校)
- Higashi Ochiai (東落合小学校)
- Higashiteragata (東寺方小学校)
- Hijirigaoka (聖ヶ丘小学校)
- Kaidori (貝取小学校)
- Kitasuwa (北諏訪小学校)
- Minami Tsurumaki (南鶴牧小学校)
- Nagayama (永山小学校)
- Nishiochiai (西落合小学校)
- Omatsudai (大松台小学校)
- Renkoji (連光寺小学校)
- Suwa (諏訪小学校)
- Tama No. 1 (多摩第一小学校)
- Tama No. 2 (多摩第二小学校)
- Tama No. 3 (多摩第三小学校)
- Toyogaoka (豊ヶ丘小学校)
- Uryu (瓜生小学校)

=== Islands ===
Aogashima

- Aogashima Elementary-Junior High School (青ヶ島村立青ヶ島小中学校)

Hachijo

- Mihara Elementary School (三原小学校)
- Mitsune Elementary School (三根小学校)
- Okago Elementary School (大賀郷小学校)

Kozushima

- Kozushima Elementary School (神津島村立神津小学校)

Mikurajima

- Mikurajima Elementary and Junior High School (御蔵島小中学校)

Miyake

- Miyake Elementary School (村立三宅小学校)

Niijima

- Niijima Elementary School (新島小学校)
- Shikinejima Elementary School (式根島小学校)

Ogasawara

- Ogasawara Village Municipal Ogasawara Elementary School (小笠原村立小笠原小学校) in Chichi-jima
- Ogasawara Village Municipal Haha-jima Elementary School and Junior High School (小笠原村立母島小中学校) on Haha-jima

Oshima

- Sakura Elementary School (大島町立さくら小学校)
- Tsubaki Elementary School (大島町立つばき小学校)
- Tsutsuji Elementary School (大島町立つつじ小学校)

To-shima

- Toshima Elementary and Junior High School (利島村立利島小中学校)

== Foreign government-operated ==
Russian Ministry of Foreign Affairs:

- Russian Embassy School in Tokyo

United States Department of Defense Education Activity (DoDEA) schools:

- Joan K. Mendel Elementary School
- Yokota West Elementary School

== Private ==
- American School in Japan (Elementary division)
- Aoba-Japan International School (Elementary school division)
- British School of Tokyo (Primary division)
- Canadian International School (Elementary division)
- Tokyo Chinese School (elementary school division)
- Christian Academy in Japan (elementary school division)
- Lycée Français International de Tokyo (Elementary division)
- Futaba Gakuen Elementary School (雙葉小学校)
- Global Indian International School, Tokyo Campus (Elementary division)
- Gyosei Primary School (暁星小学校)
- India International School in Japan (elementary school division)
- International School of the Sacred Heart (elementary school division)
- Jiyu Gakuen (elementary school division)
- K. International School Tokyo (elementary school division)
- Keimei Gakuen
- Tokyo Korean School (Elementary division)
- Tokyo Korean 1st Elementary and Junior High School (東京朝鮮第一初中級学校)
- Tokyo Korean 4th Elementary and Junior High School (東京朝鮮第四初中級学校)
- Tokyo Korean 5th Elementary and Junior High School (東京朝鮮第五初中級学校)
- Tokyo Korean 6th Elementary School (東京朝鮮第六初級学校)
- West Tokyo Korean No. 1. Elementary and Junior High School (西東京朝鮮第一初中級学校)
- West Tokyo Korean No. 2. Elementary and Junior High School (西東京朝鮮第二初中級学校)
- Little Angels International School (Elementary division)
- Sacred Heart School in Tokyo (elementary school division)
- St. Mary's International School (elementary school division)
- Salesians of Don Bosco Salesian Primary and Junior High School (サレジオ小学校・中学校)
- Seisen International School (elementary school division)
- Shirayuri Joshi Gakuen Elementary School (白百合学園小学校), girls' school, affiliated with Shirayuri Women's University
- Tokyo Soka Elementary School
- Waseda Jitsugyo Primary, Junior High, and Senior High School

Former:

- German School Tokyo (now in Yokohama)

== See also ==
- Elementary schools in Japan
- List of junior high schools in Tokyo
- List of high schools in Tokyo
- List of kindergartens in Tokyo
