= Kan Kikuchi (footballer) =

Japanese footballer

Personal information
- Date of birth: 3 May 1977 (age 49)
- Place of birth: Nishitōkyō, Tokyo, Japan
- Height: 1.82 m (5 ft 11 1/2 in)
- Position: Defender

Youth career
- 1996–1999: Asia University

Senior career*
| Years | Team | Apps | (Gls) |
| 2000–2004 | Ome FC | | |
| 2005–2006 | FC Fuente Higashikurume | | |
| 2006–2009 | FC Gifu | | |
| 2010 | Bontang FC | 13 | (2) |
- * Club domestic league appearances and goals

Kan Kikuchi (菊池 完, Kikuchi Kan; born 3 May 1977) is a former Japanese football player.

== Club statistics ==
| Club performance | | | League | | Cup | | Total | |
| Season | Club | League | Apps | Goals | Apps | Goals | Apps | Goals |
| Japan | | | League | | Emperor's Cup | | Total | |
|---|---|---|---|---|---|---|---|---|
| 2008 | FC Gifu | J2 League | 28 | 1 | 2 | 0 | 30 | 1 |
| 2009 | FC Gifu | J2 League | 35 | 0 | 2 | 0 | 37 | 0 |
| Country | Japan | | 63 | 1 | 4 | 0 | 67 | 1 |
| Total | | | 63 | 1 | 4 | 0 | 67 | 1 |
