= Tanashi Elementary School =

- Tanashi Elementary School in 2015
- 4-5-21 Tanashicho, Nishitōkyō, Tokyo; Japan

Information
- Type: Elementary school
- Established: 25 August 1873
- Website: www.nishitokyo.ed.jp/e-tanashi

Nishitokyo Municipal Tanashi Elementary School (西東京市立田無小学校, Nishitōkyō Shiritsu Tanashi Shōgakkō) is an elementary school located in Nishitōkyō in Tokyo, Japan. It was founded in 1873.

== History ==
The school moved to its current location in 1925. During World War II there were a number of military factories located nearby, including one operated by Nakajima Aircraft Company.

In July 2018 during construction of a building a large number of World War II-era weapons were located buried at the school around 1-2 meters underground. Around 1,400 firearms (rifles and machine guns) and 1,200 swords were located. Grenades, bullets and cannon shells were also discovered. It is thought that the weapons and ammunition were discarded at the end of the war by the Imperial Japanese Army. The recovery work continued until August 3. Nishitōkyō city disposed of the swords and guns and personal of the Japan Self-Defense Forces disposed of the ammunition and explosives. A total of around 300 bullets, shells and grenades were found. While many articles described the edged weapons as "swords", they appeared to be Type 30 bayonets in published images.

== See also ==
- List of elementary schools in Tokyo
