= Musashino University =

University in Tokyo, Japan

Coordinates: 35°43′11.80″N 139°32′50.02″E

- 武蔵野大学
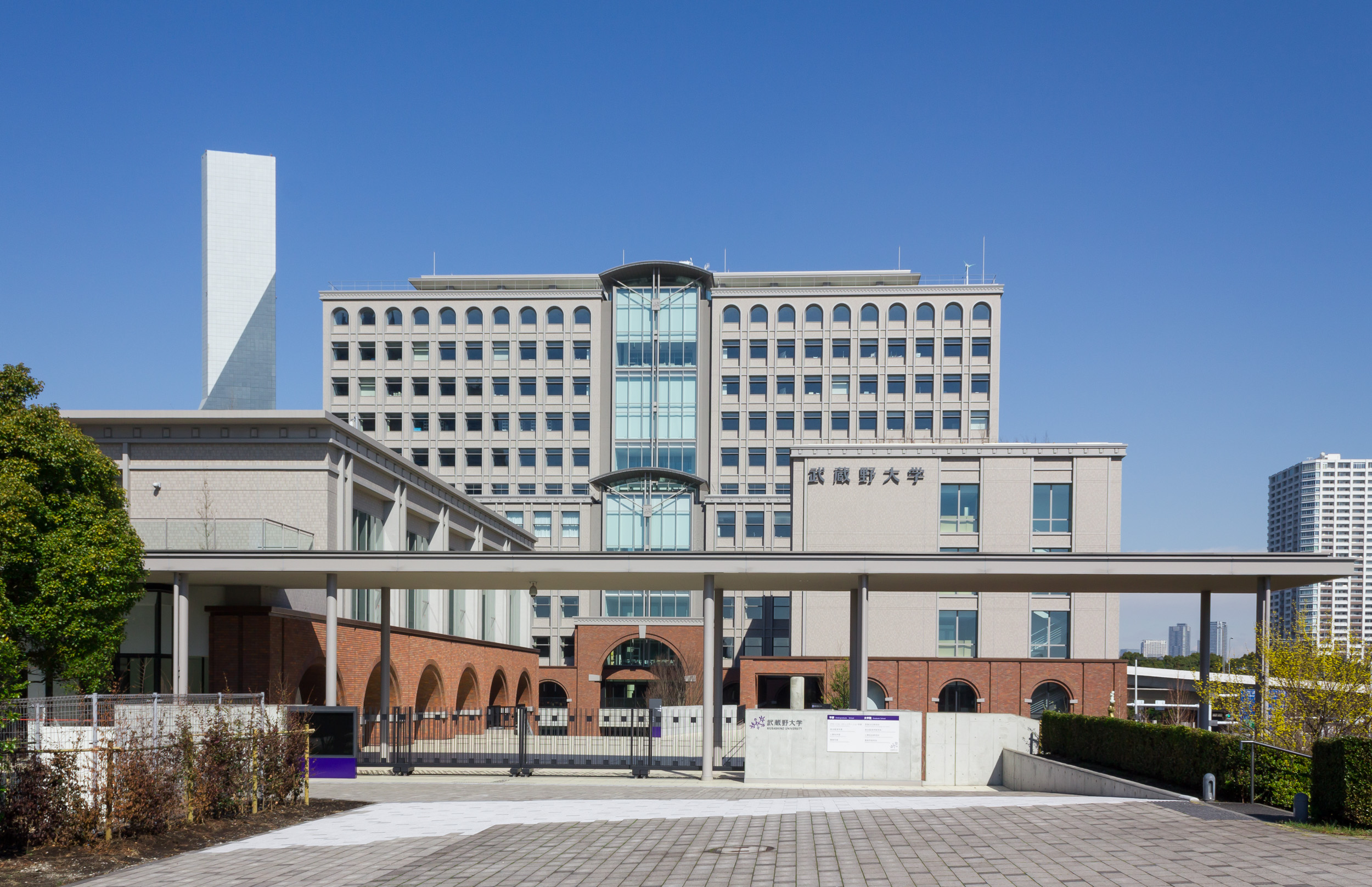
- Former names: Musashino Women's Academy (1924–1965); Musashino Women's University (1965–2003)
- Motto: Creating Peace & Happiness for the World
- Type: Private
- Established: 1924; 102 years ago
- Founder: Takakusu Junjiro
- Location: Kōtō, Tokyo, Japan
- Campus: Urban
- Website: www.musashino-u.ac.jp

Musashino University (武蔵野大学, Musashino Daigaku) is a private university with the main campus in Ariake, Kōtō, Tokyo, and a second campus in Nishitōkyō. Musashino University was founded based on the ideals associated with the Hongwanji Jodo Shinshu School of Buddhism.

== History ==
Established in 1924 as Musashino Women's Academy (武蔵野女子学院, Musashino Joshi Gakuin) by Junjiro Takakusu (1866–1945), an internationally known Buddhist scholar. The institution was to be based on the principles of "Buddhist-based human education". Takakusu was a progressive thinker who stressed women's education and involvement in society. The Japanese government conferred the Order of Culture on him in 1944.

== Campus ==
The university has two campuses, the main one located in Ariake and a sub-urban campus in Nishitokyo.

=== Ariake Campus ===
The Ariake Campus was opened in 2012, with the university's administrative facilities and some of the departments and graduate schools relocated from the Nishitokyo Campus.

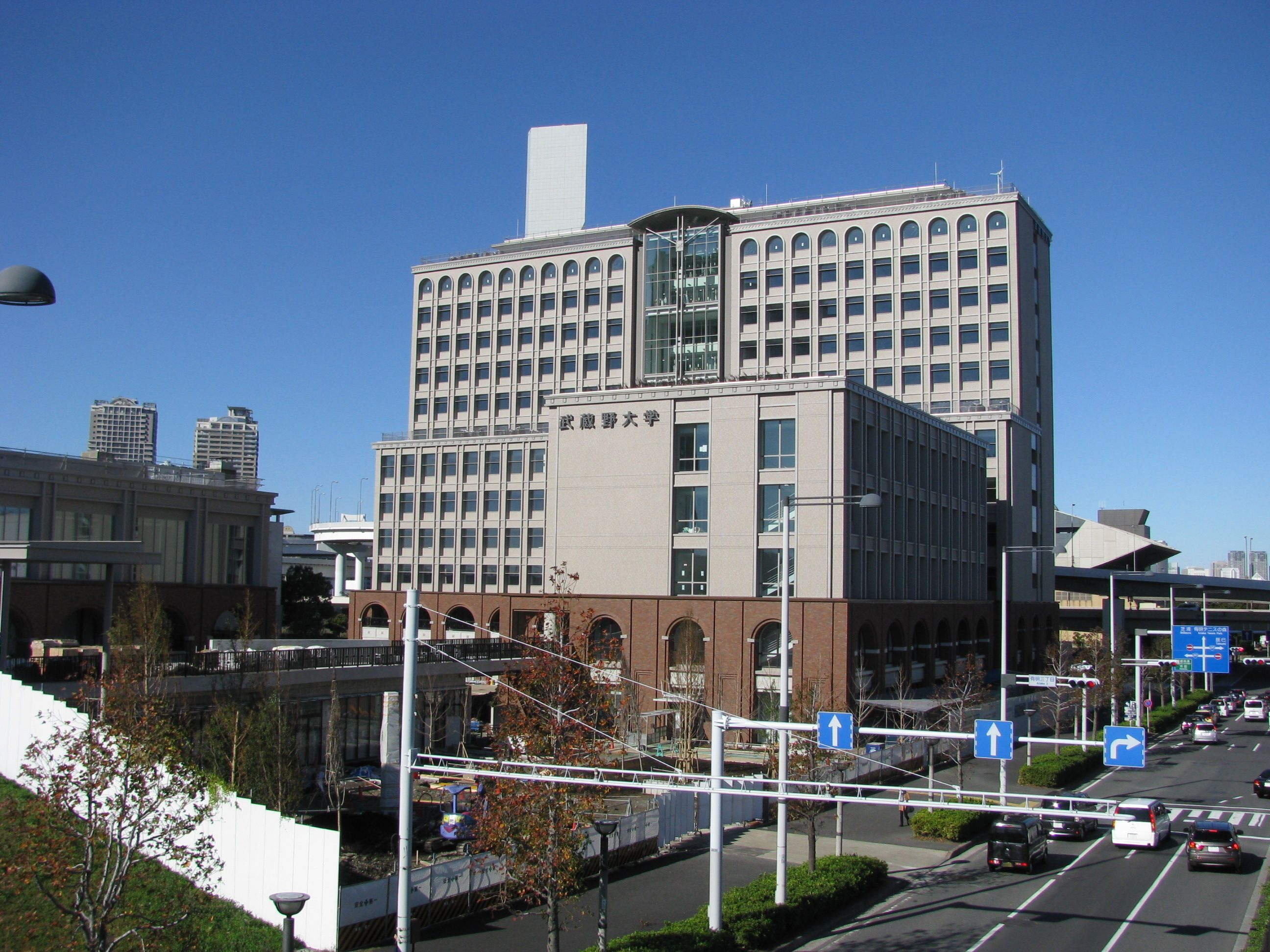
Musashino University Ariake Campus

== Faculties ==
The university has expanded in size and scope since its founding in the early years of the 20th century.

=== Graduate school ===
- Department of Human Sciences and Culture

School of Language and Culture
School of Human Sciences
School of Social Systems
School of Social Welfare Management

=== Undergraduate program ===
- Faculty of Literature

Department of Japanese Language and Literature
Department of English Language and Literature

- Faculty of Contemporary Society

Department of Contemporary Society Studies
Department of Social Welfare

- Faculty of Human Studies

Department of Human Studies
Department of Environmental Science

Major in Design for Architectural Environment
Major in Environment and Amenities

Department of Early Childhood Care and Education

- Faculty of Pharmacy

Department of Pharmaceutical Sciences

- Faculty of Nursing

Department of Nursing

- Correspondence Division [Faculty of Human Studies] (Japanese)

Department of Human Studies

- Faculty of Global Studies

Department of Global Business (English track)
Department of Global Communication
Department of Japanese Communication

== Musashino Joshi Gakuin ==
The Musashino Joshi Gakuin is a private girls' junior high and high school located on the university campus and is associated with Mushashino University. The schools operate as escalator schools into the university.
