= Chuo Elementary School (Tokyo) =

Public school in Chuo, Tokyo, Japan

- Chuo, Tokyo; Japan

Information
- Type: Public elementary school

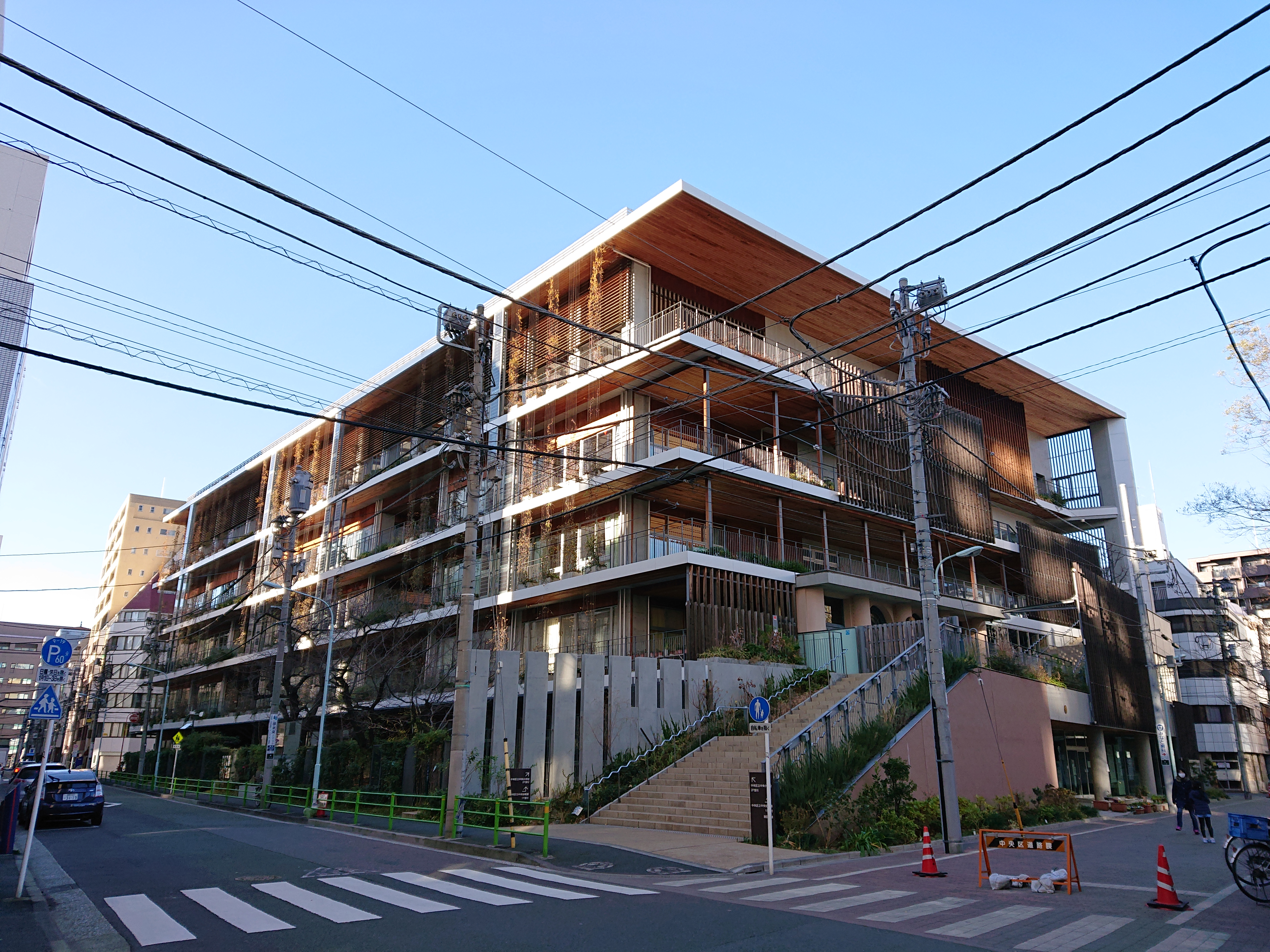
Chuo Elementary School

Chuo Municipal Chuo Elementary School (中央区立中央小学校, Chūō-kuritsu Chūō Shōgakkō) is a public elementary school in Minato, Chuo, Tokyo. It is operated by the Chuo City Board of Education (中央区教育委員会).

Its attendance boundary is Minato 1 and 2-chome, Irifune 1 and 2-chome, and Hatchobori.

== History ==
It was formed on April 1, 1993 (Heisei 5) by the merger of Kyoka Elementary School (中央区立京華小学校) and Teppozu Elementary School (中央区立鉄砲洲小学校). The school board had the new school use the Teppozu building, although the Kyoka building was used temporarily until August 31 of that year. Classes at the ex-Teppozu building started on September 1.

In 2009 the school had 112 students. By 2010 there were plans to raze the original building to build a new school building. Hideo Takahashi, an alumnus of Teppozu, campaigned against the building's destruction on historical grounds, and his son Yoshiaki argued against the destruction due to historical reasons and the price tag of the new school building.

The school held a farewell celebration of the former building on July 17, 2010. Classes were temporarily held at Meisho Elementary School (明正小学校) from September 1, 2010 to September 3, 2012, the day the new school building opened. The current school building was to have a playground on the last floor, and a retractable roof over it. The building houses elementary and kindergarten classes. The current building, designed by Kume Sekkei, was given the Good Design Award in 2013.

== See also ==
- Elementary schools in Japan
- List of elementary schools in Tokyo
