= Miho Tanaka (model) =

Japanese model, entertainer, and actress (born 1983)

- 田中 美保
- Born: January 12, 1983 (age 43); Nishitōkyō, Tokyo, Japan
- Education: Tokyo Metropolitan Higashimurayama High School
- Occupations: Model, entertainer, actress
- Agents: Office Palette; Asia Business Partners
- Height: 1.67 m (5 ft 6 in)
- Spouse: Junichi Inamoto (m. 2012)
- Children: 1

Miho Tanaka (田中 美保, Tanaka Miho; born January 12, 1983, in Nishitōkyō, Tokyo, Japan) is a Japanese model, entertainer, and actress who was represented by Office Palette until March 31, 2010, and by Asia Business Partners after that. Her husband is former Japan national football team player Junichi Inamoto.

== Filmography ==
=== Dramas ===
Year	Title	Role	Network	Notes
2009	0-gōshitsu no Kyaku		Fuji TV	
2011	Bartender	Aki Nanbara	TV Asahi	Episode 4
2011	Hanawa-ka no Yonshimai	Kana Horiuchi	TBS	
2011	Hontoni Atta Kowai Hanashi Natsu no Tokubetsu-hen 2011	Saki Mizushima	Fuji TV	
2012	Run60	Yoko Kawanaka	MBS	Episodes 7 to 9
2012	Ren'ai Kentei	Miyu Natsui	NHK BS Premium	Episode 1
2015	Watashitachi ga Propose sa Renai no ni wa, 101 no Riyū ga Atteda na	Noriko	LaLa TV	Episode 13

=== Variety series ===
Year	Title	Network	Notes	Ref.
2002	Hon'nō no High Kick!	Fuji TV		
2005	Koisuru Hanikami	TBS		
2010	Waratte Iitomo!	Fuji TV		
2010	SMAP×SMAP	Fuji TV		
2010	Non-no TV	BS-TBS		
2011	Shirushirumishiru	TV Asahi	Guest appearances	
2011	London Hearts	TV Asahi	Guest appearances	
2013	Mecha-Mecha Iketeru!	Fuji TV		
2013	Sora Tabi o Anata e: Premium Sky	Fuji TV		
2015	Dosanko Wide 179	STV		

=== Television networks ===
Year	Title	Notes
2006	Music On! TV	
2006	Fuji TV 721 739	

=== Films ===
Year	Title	Role	Notes
2012	One Piece Film: Z	Homey	Voice
