= Nishitokyo =

Nishitokyo 西東京市
- City
- Nishitokyo
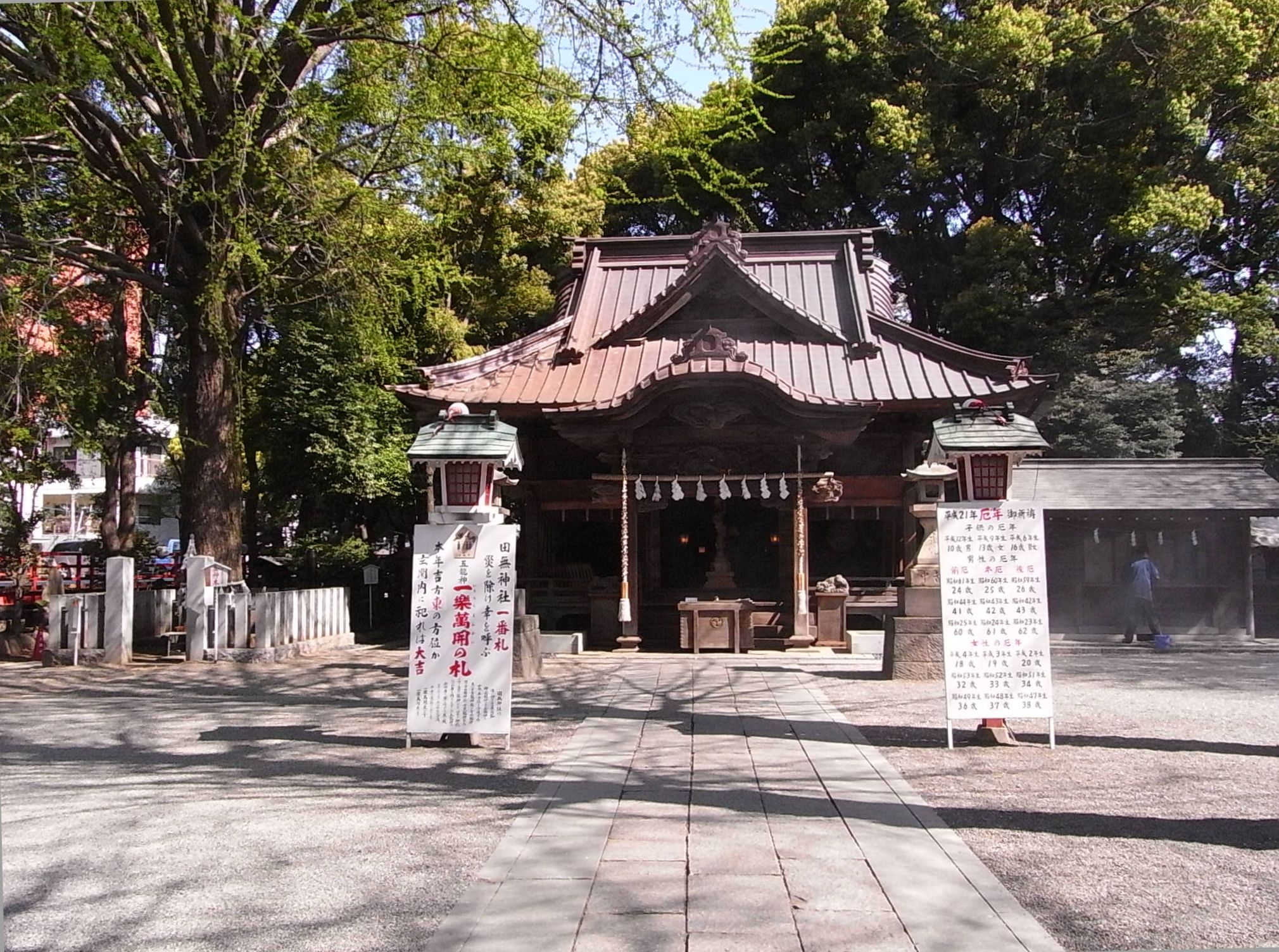
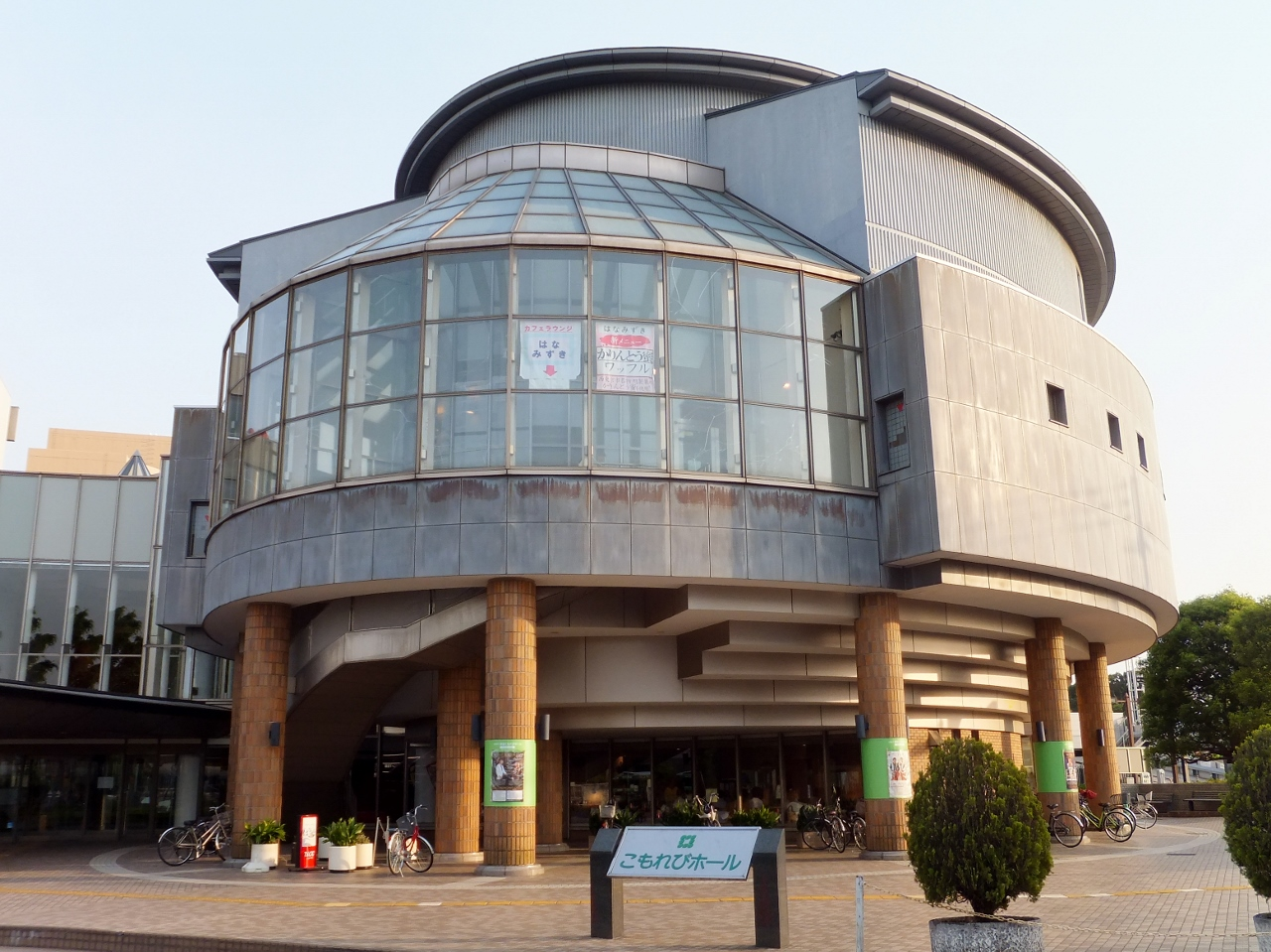
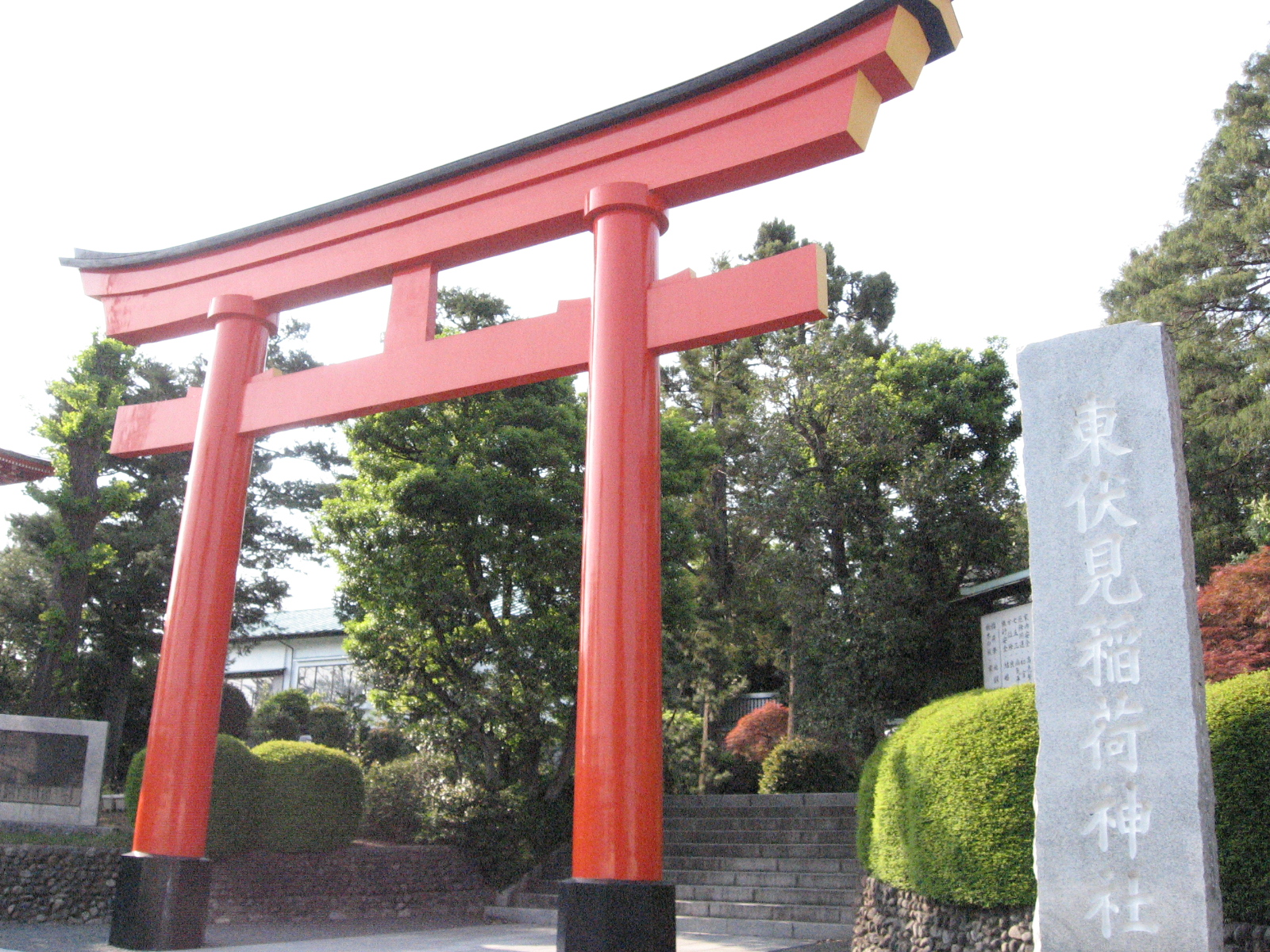
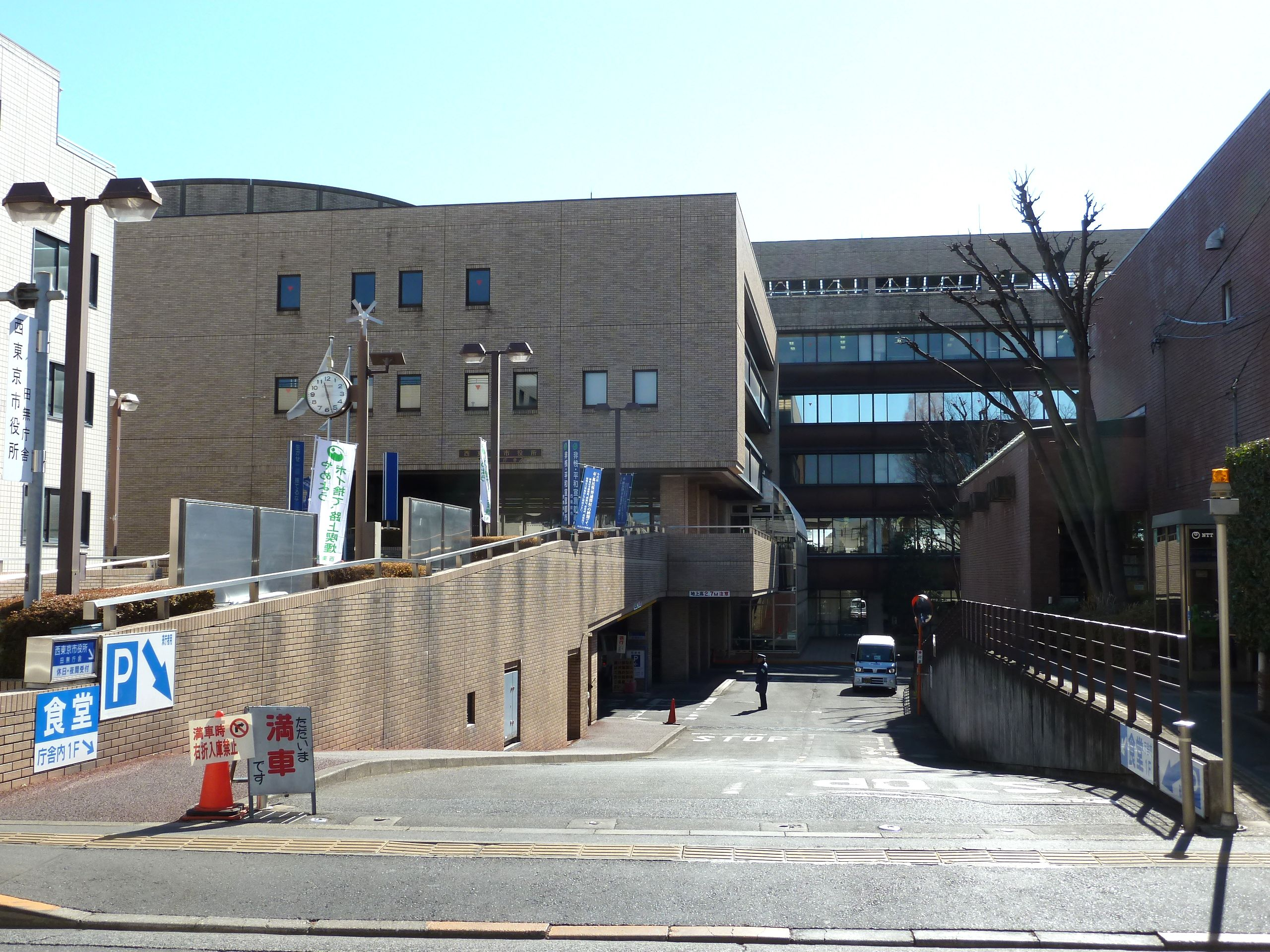
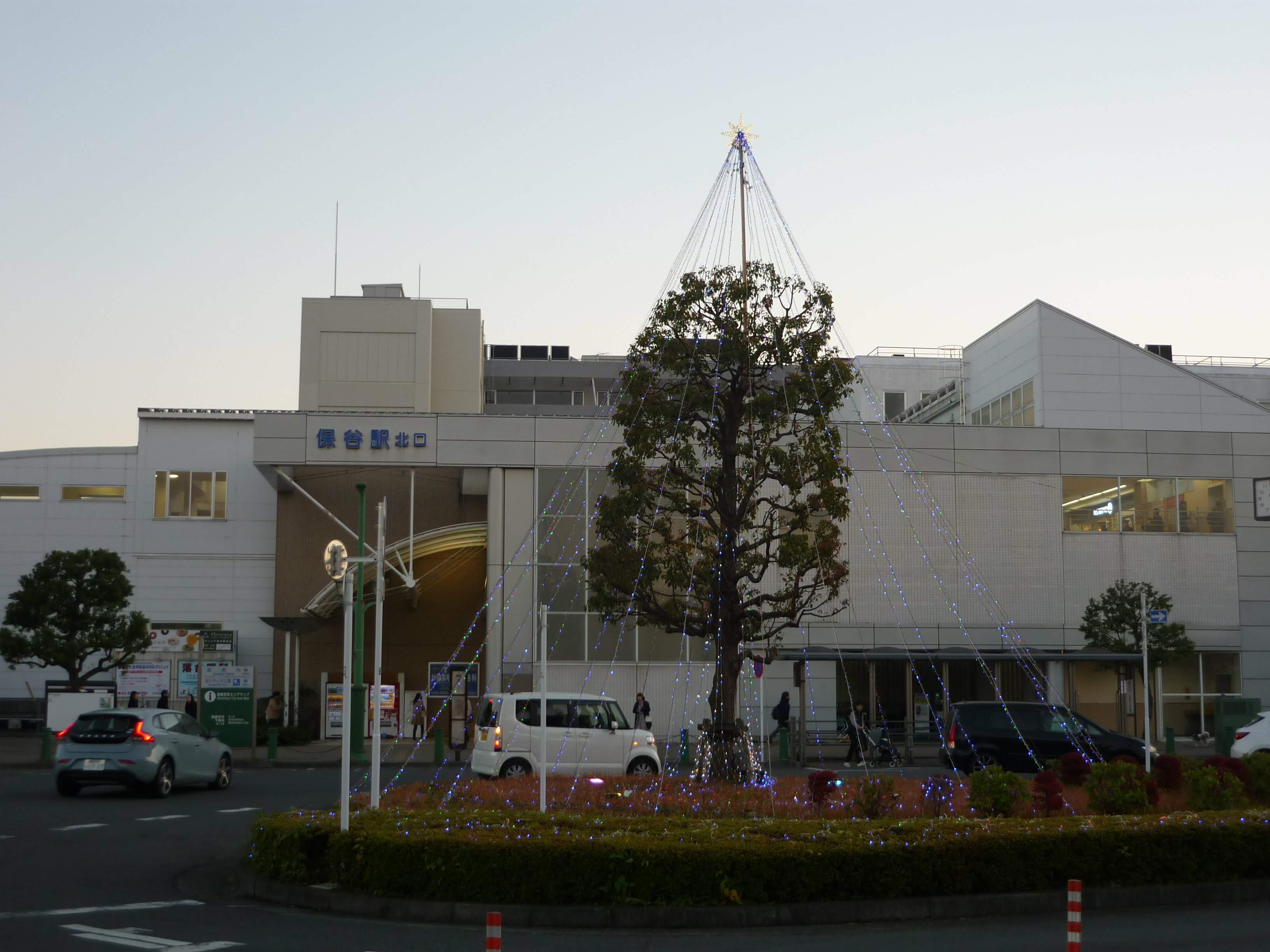
- Top to bottom, left to right: Tanashi Shrine; Komorebi Hall; Higashifushimi Inari Shrine; Nishitokyo City Hall; Hoya Station

- Flag Seal

- Location of Nishitokyo in Tokyo

- Coordinates: 35°43′32.2″N 139°32′17.7″E
- Country: Japan
- Region: Kantō
- Prefecture: Tokyo

Area
  - Total: 15.75 km^{2} (6.08 sq mi)

Population (January 2021)
  - Total: 206,047
  - Density: 13,080/km^{2} (33,880/sq mi)
- Time zone: UTC+9 (Japan Standard Time)
- Symbols
  - Tree: Zelkova serrata & Cornus florida
  - Flower: Azalea, Sunflower, Cosmos, Narcissus
- Phone number: 042-464-1311
- Address: 5-6-13 Minami-machi, Nishitōkyō-shi, Tokyo 188-8666
- Website: Official website

Nishitokyo (西東京市, Nishitōkyō-shi; "City of West Tokyo") (Japanese pronunciation: [ɲiɕi̥toꜜːkʲoː]) is a city located in the western portion of Tokyo Metropolis, Japan. As of 1 January 2021, the city had an estimated population of 206,047, and a population density of 13,000 persons per km^{2}. The total area of the city is 15.75 square kilometres (6.08 sq mi).

== Geography ==
Nishitokyo is located at the centre of the geological/geographical region known as the Musashino Terrace, and is covered with the Kantō loam formation. The city has a good water supply, owing to rivers running through the city - the Shakujii River, Shirako River, Shin River (tributary of Shirako River) and Tamagawa Josui River. From east to west, the city is about 4.8 km, and from south to north is about 5.6 km.

=== Neighborhoods ===
- former city of Hoya

Fuji-machi, Hibarigaoka, Higashi-cho, Higashi-fushimi, Hoya-cho, Izumi-cho, Kita-machi, Naka-machi, Sakae-cho, Shimo-hoya, Shin-machi, Sumiyoshi-cho, Yagisawa

- former city of Tanashi

Kitahara-cho, Midori-cho, Minami-cho, Mukodai-cho, Nishihara-cho, Shibakubo-cho, Tanashi-cho, Yato-cho

=== Surrounding municipalities ===
- Saitama Prefecture
  - Niiza
- Tokyo Metropolis
  - Higashikurume
  - Kodaira
  - Koganei
  - Musashino
  - Nerima

=== Climate ===
Nishitokyo has a humid subtropical climate (Köppen Cfa) characterized by warm summers and cool winters with light to no snowfall. The average annual temperature in Nishitokyo is 14.5 °C. The average annual rainfall is 1648 mm with September as the wettest month. The temperatures are highest on average in August, at around 26.0 °C, and lowest in January, at around 3.1 °C.

== Demographics ==
Per Japanese census data, the population of Nishitokyo increased rapidly in the 1950s and 1960s and has continued to grow at a slower pace in recent decades.

Historical population
Year	Pop.	±%
1920	6,723	—
1930	8,972	+33.5%
1940	10,977	+22.3%
1950	28,343	+158.2%
1960	78,091	+175.5%
1970	144,660	+85.2%
1980	158,235	+9.4%
1990	170,290	+7.6%
2000	180,885	+6.2%
2010	196,494	+8.6%
2020	207,388	+5.5%

== History ==
The area of present-day Nishitokyo was part of ancient Musashi Province. In the post-Meiji Restoration cadastral reform of July 22, 1878, the area became part of Kitadachi District in Saitama Prefecture. The villages of Hoya and Tanashi were created on April 1, 1889, with the establishment of modern municipalities system. The southern portion of Kitaadachi District was transferred to the administrative control of Tokyo Metropolis on April 1, 1907.

The city of Nishitokyo was established on January 21, 2001, by the merger of the cities of Hoya and Tanashi.

== Government ==
Nishitokyo has a mayor-council form of government with a directly elected mayor and a unicameral city council of 28 members. Nishitokyo contributes two members to the Tokyo Metropolitan Assembly. In terms of national politics, the city is part of Tokyo 19th district of the lower house of the Diet of Japan.

== Economy ==
The watch manufacturer Citizen is headquartered in Nishitokyo. The animation studios Shin-Ei Animation and Magic Bus are also located here.

== Education ==
=== Universities and colleges ===
- Musashino University
- Waseda University - Higashi-Fushimi campus
- Tokyo University - Tanashi campus

=== Primary and secondary education ===
The city has three public high schools operated by the Tokyo Metropolitan Government Board of Education.

- Hoya High School
- Tanashi High School
- Tanashi Technical High School

Nishitokyo has 18 public elementary schools and nine public junior high schools operated by the city government.

Public junior high schools:

- Hibarigaoka (ひばりが丘中学校)
- Houya (保谷中学校)
- Meihou (明保中学校)
- Seiran (青嵐中学校)
- Tanashi No. 1 (田無第一中学校)
- Tanashi No. 2 (田無第二中学校)
- Tanashi No. 3 (田無第三中学校)
- Tanashi No. 4 (田無第四中学校)
- Yagisawa (柳沢中学校)

Public elementary schools:

- Hekizan (碧山小学校)
- Higashi (東小学校)
- Higashi Fushimi (東伏見小学校)
- Honcho (本町小学校)
- Houya (保谷小学校)
- Houya No. 1 (保谷第一小学校)
- Houya No. 2 (保谷第二小学校)
- Kami Mukodai (上向台小学校)
- Keyaki (けやき小学校)
- Mukodai (向台小学校)
- Nakahara (中原小学校)
- Sakae (栄小学校)
- Shibakubo (芝久保小学校)
- Sumiyoshi (住吉小学校)
- Tanashi
- Yagisawa (柳沢小学校)
- Yato (谷戸小学校)
- Yato No. 2 (谷戸第二小学校)

There are three private high schools:

- Bunka Girls' High School
- Iwakura High School
- Musashino Joshi Gakuin, private combined middle/high school.

== Transportation ==
=== Railway ===
Seibu Railway – Seibu Ikebukuro Line

- Hōya - Hibarigaoka

Seibu Railway – Seibu Shinjuku Line

- Higashi-Fushimi - Seibu-Yagisawa - Tanashi

=== Highway ===
Nishitokyo is not served by any national expressways or national highways

== Notable people ==
- Shotaro Ashino (born 1990), Japanese professional wrestler
- Kyary Pamyu Pamyu (born 1993), Japanese singer, model, J-pop idol and Kawaii/Decora icon (Real Name: Kiriko Takemura, Nihongo: 竹村 桐子, Takemura Kiriko)
- Naoyuki Yamazaki (born 1991), Japanese football player
- Kohei Sato (born 1996), Japanese Ice Hockey player
- Eiji Ōtsuka (born 1958), social critic, folklorist, media theorist, and novelist.
- Tadanari Lee (born 1985), Zainichi Korean football player (Korean Name: Lee Chung-Sung, Hangul: 이충성)/Japanese Name: Tadanari Lee, Nihongo: 李忠成, Ri Tadanari or Tadanari Ōyama, Nihongo: 大山忠成, Ōyama Tadanari)
- Ginga Munetomo (born 1994), Japanese trampolinist
- Diamond Yukai (1962), Japanese rock singer and actor (Real Name: Yutaka Tadokoro, Nihongo: 田所豊, Tadokoro Yutaka)
- Kan Kikuchi (born 1977), former Japanese football player
- Misa Shimizu (born 1970), Japanese actress
- Luke Takamura (born 1964), Japanese musician
- Koriki Choshu (born 1972), Japanese comedian (Real Name: Kazuteru Kubota, Nihongo: 久保田和輝, Kubota Kazuteru)
- Mei Kurokawa (born 1987), Japanese singer and actress
- Ryotaro Hironaga (born 1990), Japanese football player
- Akio Nojima (born 1945), Japanese actor, voice actor and narrator
- Shota Fukuoka (born 1995), Japanese football player
- Kazuhiro Takahashi (born 1978), Japanese ice sledge hockey player
- Tadahito "Gucci" Iguchi (born 1974), Japanese former professional baseball second baseman and current manager of the Chiba Lotte Marines of Nippon Professional Baseball (NPB).
- Takumi Motohashi (born 1982), former Japanese football player
- Mami Yamaguchi (born 1986), Japanese football player (AFC Ann Arbor)
- Tomohiro Hasumi (born 1972), former Japanese football player
- Miho Tanaka (born 1983), Japanese model, entertainer, and actress
