= Hitotsubashi =

Hitotsubashi (一ツ橋) may refer to:

- Hitotsubashi, Chiyoda, a place in Chiyoda, Tokyo
- Hitotsubashi Group, a publishing keiretsu
- Hitotsubashi University
- Hitotsubashi-Tokugawa, a branch of the Tokugawa Clan
- Hitotsubashi Yoshinobu (Keiki), the last shōgun
