= Kanda-Sakumachō, Tokyo =

District of Chiyoda, Tokyo, Japan

Sakumachō (佐久間町), officially Kanda-Sakumachō (神田佐久間町), is a district of Chiyoda, Tokyo, Japan, consisting of 1- to 4-chōme. As of April 1, 2007, its population is 963. Its postal code is 101–0025.

This district is located on the northeastern part on Chiyoda Ward. Kanda-Sakumachō 1-chōme borders Kanda-Hanaokachō and Kanda-Matsunagachō, and the district's 2 - to 4-chōme border Kanda-Izumichō on the north. The district borders Asakusabashi, Taitō, and Higashi-Kanda, Chiyoda on the east. The district's 1-chōme borders (across Kanda River) Kanda-Sudachō and Kanda-Iwamotochō, and its 2- to 4-chōme border Kanda-Sakumagashi on the south. The district borders Soto-Kanda on the west. Kanda-Hirakawachō is located between Kanda-Sakumachō 1-chōme and 2-chōme.

Akihabara Station is situated near the district.

== Education ==
Chiyoda Board of Education operates public elementary and junior high schools. Izumi Elementary School (和泉小学校) is the zoned elementary of Kanda-Sakumachō 1 through 4 chōme. There is a freedom of choice system for junior high schools in Chiyoda Ward, and so there are no specific junior high school zones.
