= Izumichō, Chiyoda, Tokyo =

District of Chiyoda, Tokyo, Japan

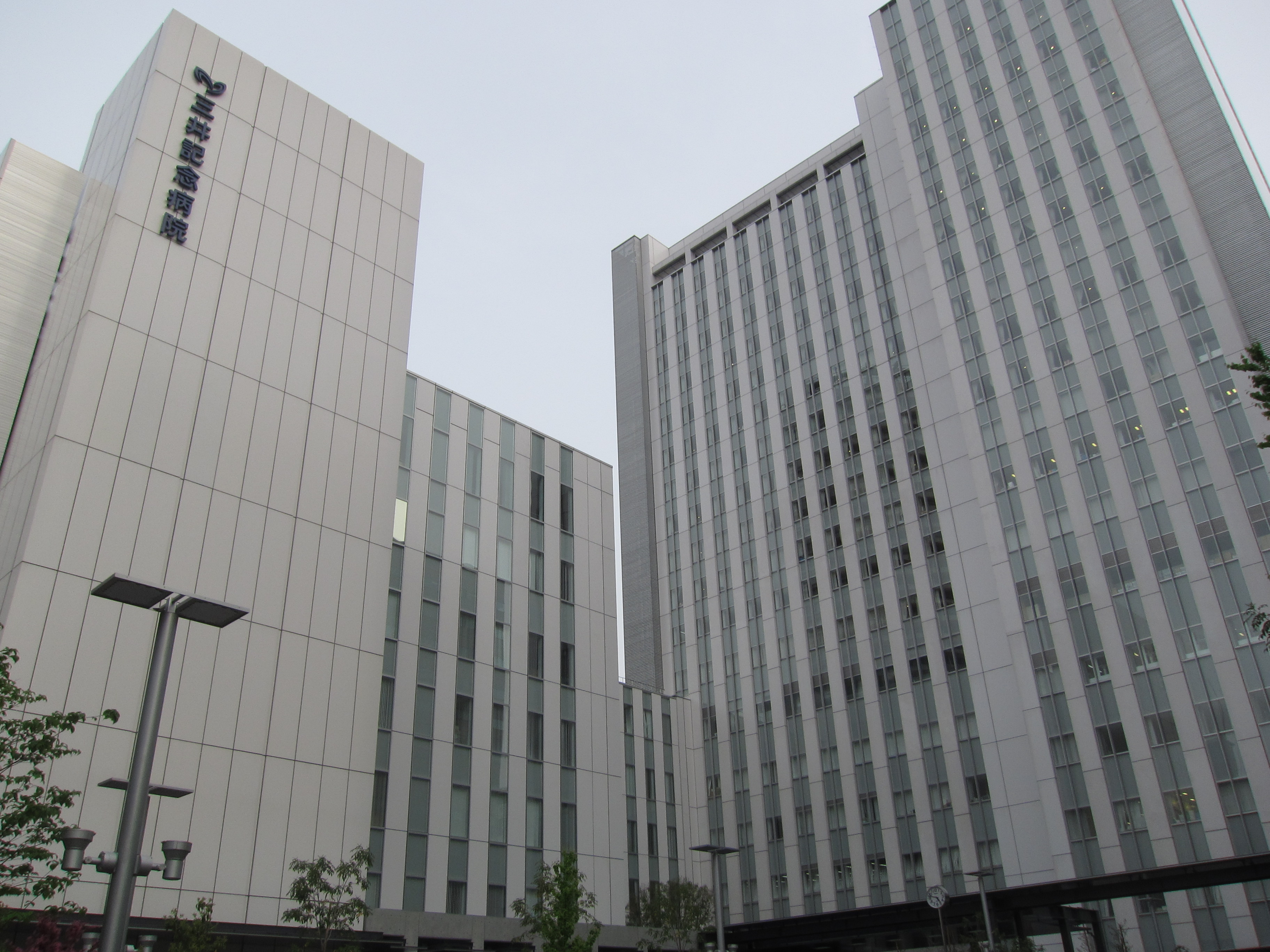
Mitsui Memorial Hospital-1

Izumichō (和泉町), officially Kanda-Izumichō (神田和泉町), is a district of Chiyoda, Tokyo, Japan. As of April 1, 2007, its population is 629. Its postal code is 101-0024.

This district is located on the northeastern part of Chiyoda Ward. It borders Taitō 1-chōme, Taitō to the north; (across Kiyosubashi-dōri Avenue) Asakusabashi, Taitō to the east; (across Sakumagakkō-dōri Avenue) Kanda-Sakumachō, Chiyoda to the south; and (across Shōwa-dōri Avenue) Kanda-Matsunagachō, Chiyoda to the west.

As a business district, Izumichō is home to the headquarters of YKK Group, world's largest zipper manufacturer, and Toppan Printing, one of the Nikkei 225 companies of Japan.

== Education ==
Chiyoda Board of Education operates public elementary and junior high schools. Izumi Elementary School (和泉小学校) is the zoned elementary school for Kanda-Izumichō. There is a freedom of choice system for junior high schools in Chiyoda Ward, and so there are no specific junior high school zones.
