= Sakumagashi, Tokyo =

District of Chiyoda, Tokyo, Japan

Sakumagashi (佐久間河岸), officially Kanda-Sakumagashi (神田佐久間河岸), is a district of Chiyoda, Tokyo, Japan. As of April 1, 2007, its population is 33. Its postal code is 101-0026.

This district is located on the northeastern part of Chiyoda Ward. It borders Kanda-Sakumachō on the north, (across Mikura Bridge) Higashi-Kanda 3-chōme on the east, (across Kanda River) Iwamotochō 3-chōme and Higashi-Kanda 2-chōme on the south, and (across Izumi Bridge of Shōwa-dōri Avenue) Kanda-Sakumachō 1-chōme on the west.

An exit of Akihabara Station of Tokyo Metro Hibiya Line is located within the district.

== Education ==
Chiyoda Board of Education operates public elementary and junior high schools. Izumi Elementary School (和泉小学校) is the zoned elementary school for Sakumagashi. There is a freedom of choice system for junior high schools in Chiyoda Ward, and so there are no specific junior high school zones.
