= Chiyoda, Tokyo =

Chiyoda 千代田区
- Special ward
- Chiyoda City
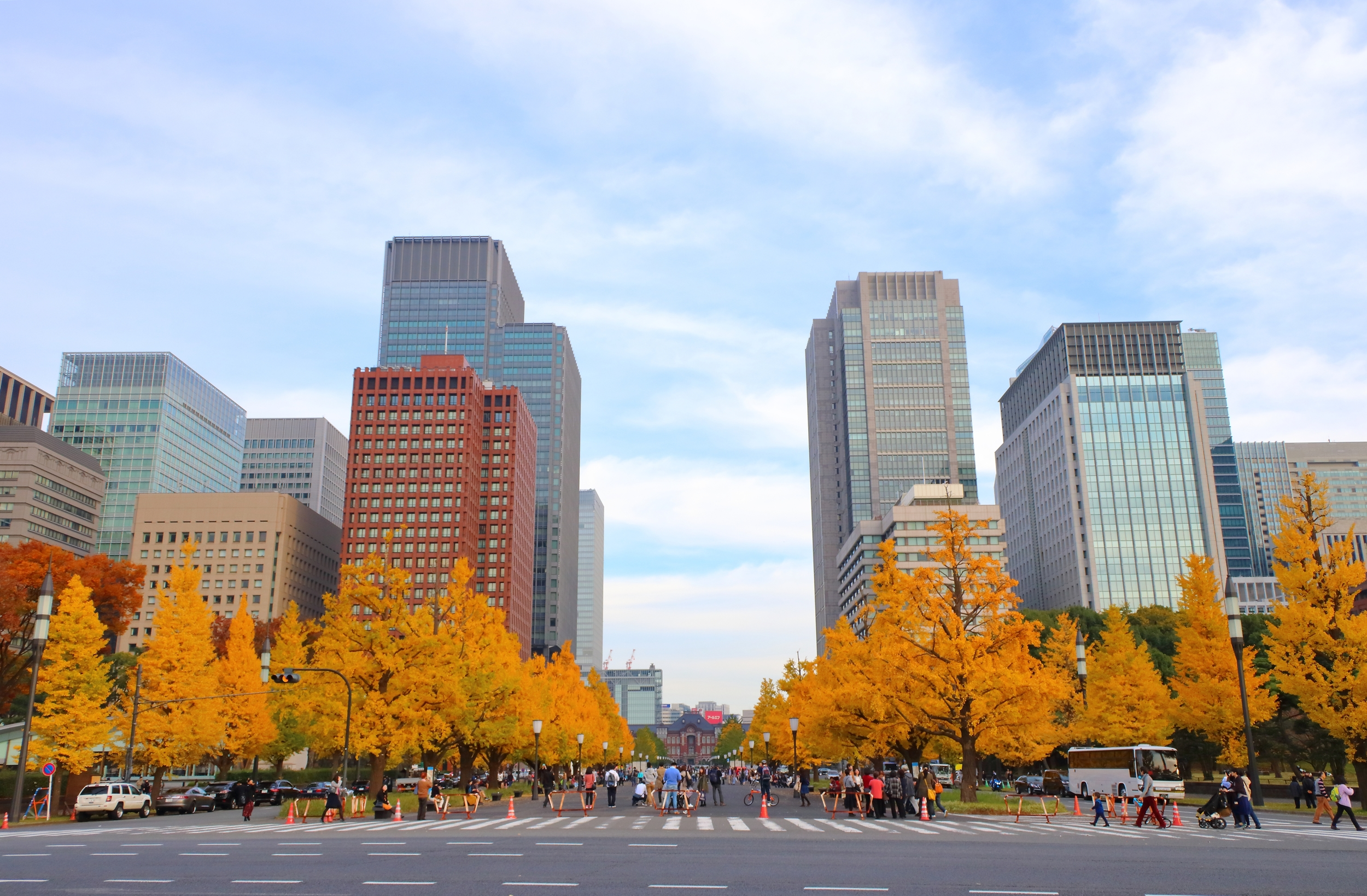
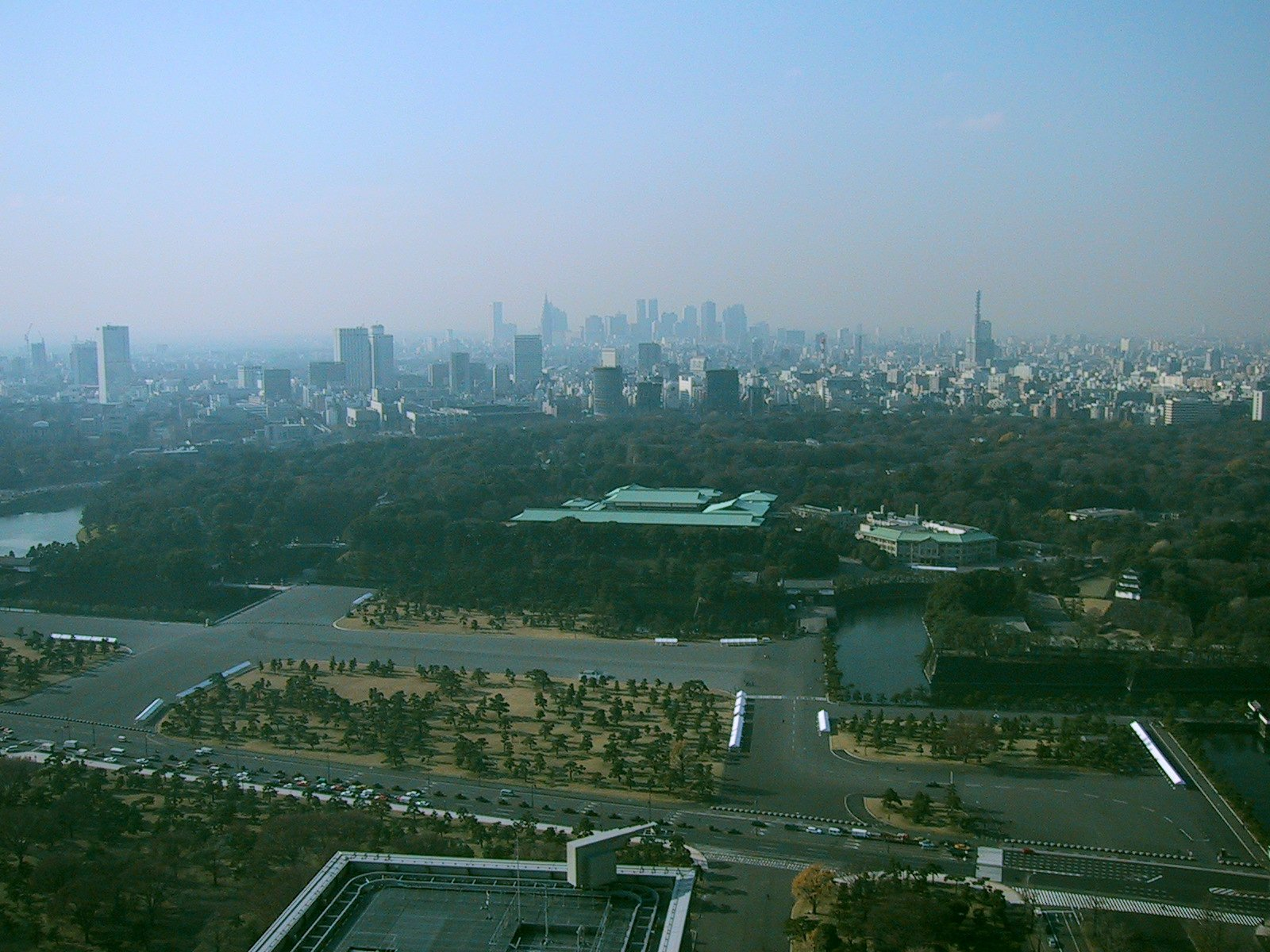
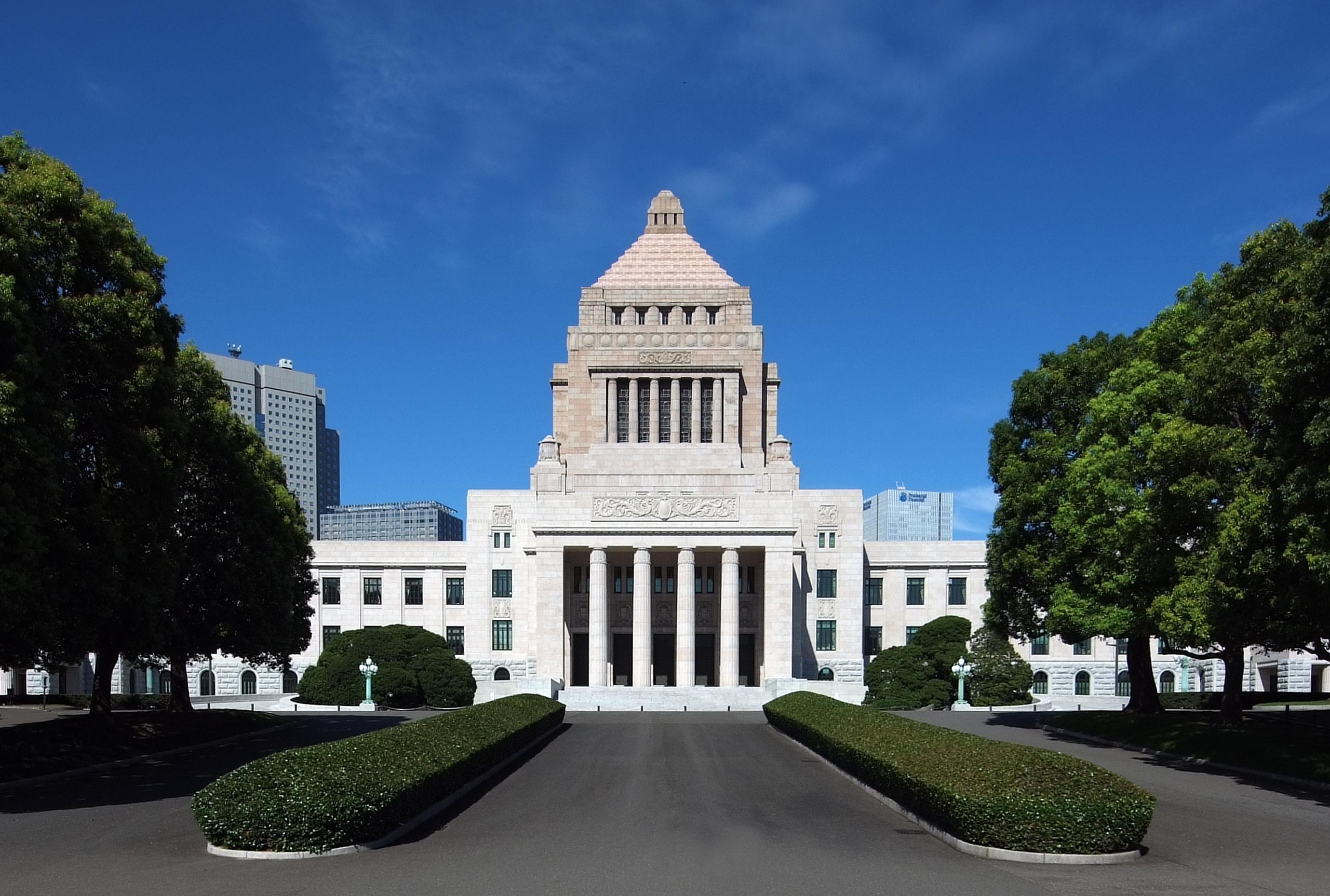
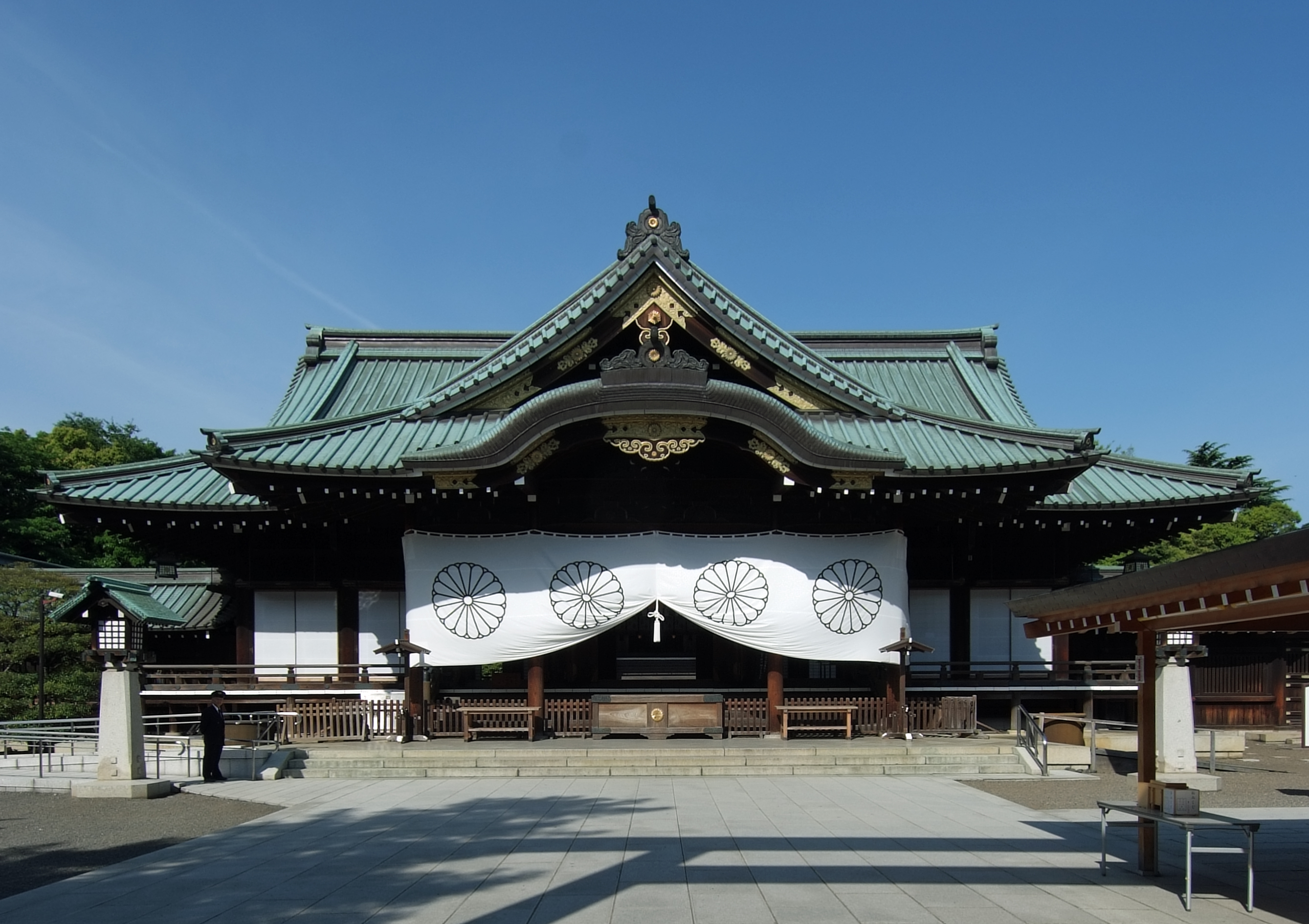
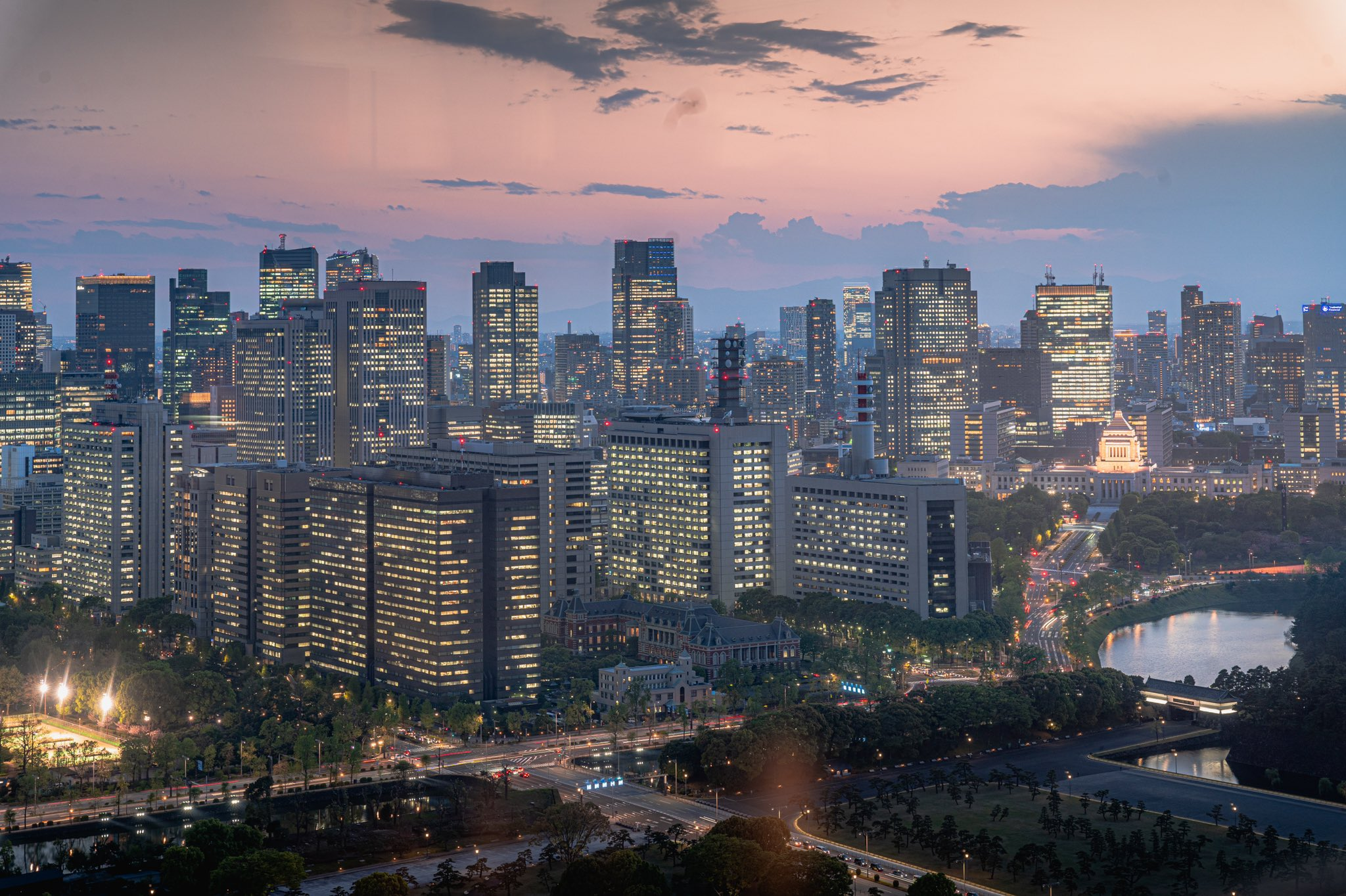
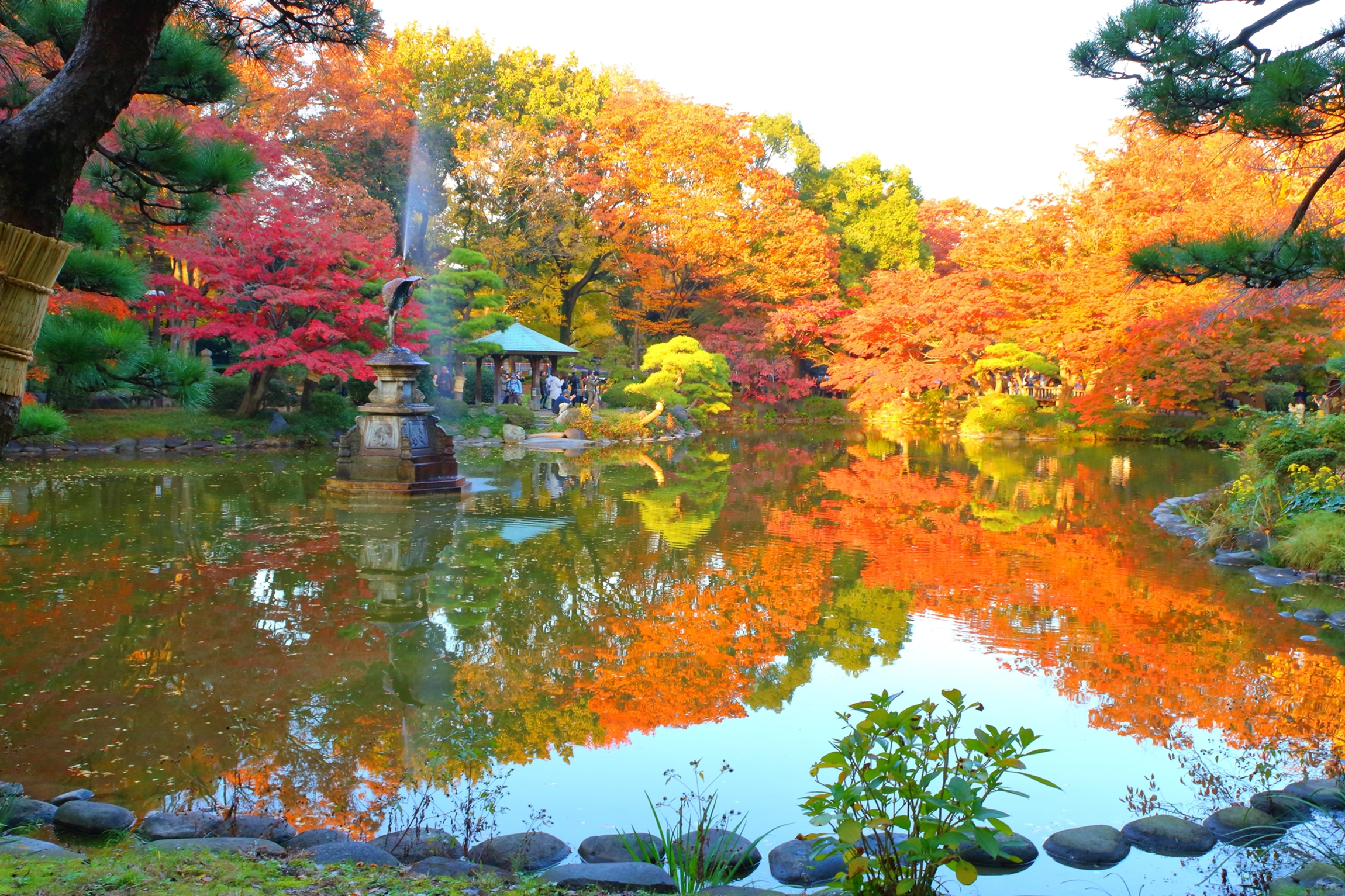
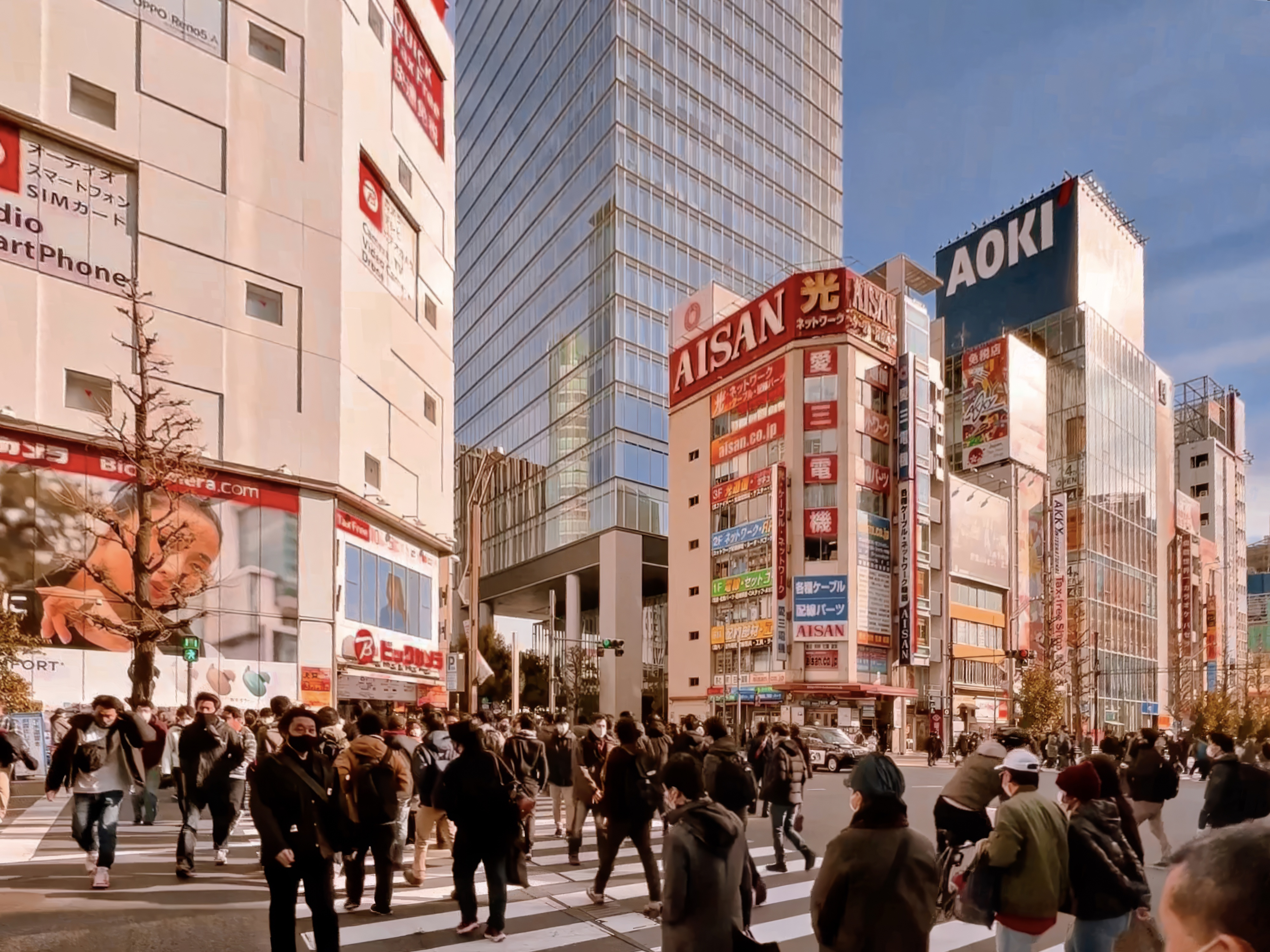
- Marunouchi Imperial Palace National Diet Building Yasukuni Shrine Kasumigaseki Hibiya Park Akihabara

- Flag Emblem

- Location of Chiyoda in Tokyo

- Location in Japan Chiyoda (Kanto Area) Chiyoda (Tokyo) Chiyoda (Special wards of Tokyo)
- Coordinates: 35°41′38.41″N 139°45′12.94″E
- Country: Japan
- Region: Kantō
- Prefecture: Tokyo

Government
  - Mayor: Takaaki Higuchi

Area
  - Total: 11.66 km^{2} (4.50 sq mi)

Population (October 1, 2020)
  - Total: 66,680
  - Density: 5,710/km^{2} (14,800/sq mi)
- Time zone: UTC+09:00 (JST)
- City hall address: 1-2-1 Kudanminami, Chiyoda, Tokyo; 102-8688
- Website: www.city.chiyoda.lg.jp
- Symbols
- Bird: Cygnus
- Flower: Sakura
- Tree: Pinus

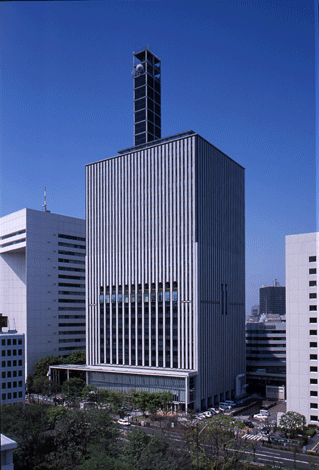
Chiyoda City Office

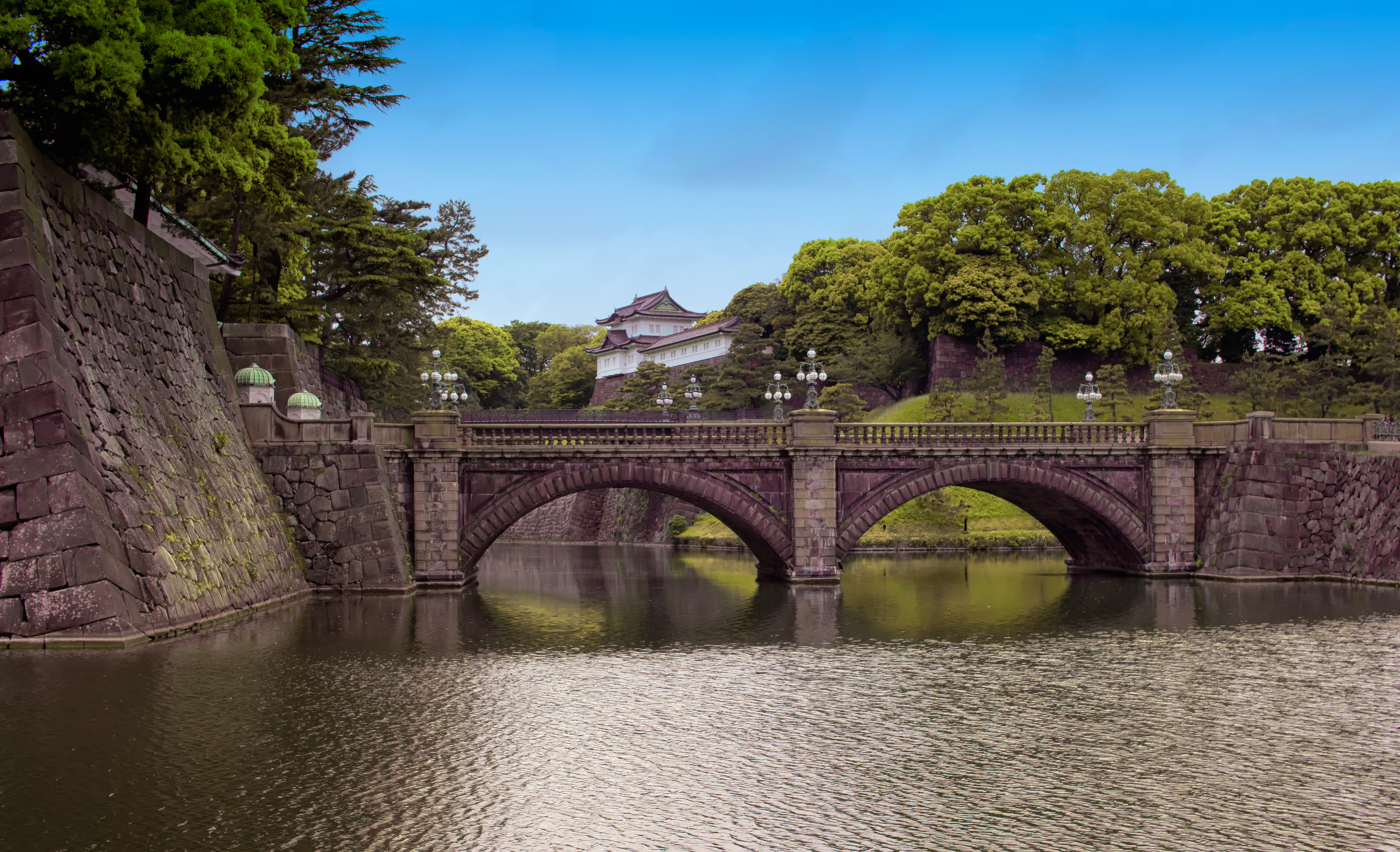
Seimon Ishibashi bridge, Imperial Palace

Chiyoda (千代田区, Chiyoda-ku; Japanese pronunciation: [c̟͡ɕí.jò̞.dä̀, c̟͡ɕì.jó̞.dä́.kɯ̈̀]), officially known as Chiyoda City in English, is a special ward of Tokyo, Japan. Located in the heart of Tokyo's 23 special wards, Chiyoda consists of the Imperial Palace and a surrounding radius of about a kilometer (1000 yards), and is known as the political and financial center of Japan. As of October 2020, the ward had a population of 66,680, and a population density of 5,709 people per km^{2} (14,786 per sq. mi.), making it by far the least populated of the special wards. The residential part of Chiyoda is at the heart of Yamanote, Tokyo's traditional upper-class residential area, with Banchō, Kōjimachi, and Kioichō considered the most exclusive neighbourhoods in the entire city. The total area is 11.66 km^{2} (4½ sq. mi.), of which the Imperial Palace, Hibiya Park, National Museum of Modern Art, and Yasukuni Shrine take up approximately 2.6 km^{2} (1 sq. mi.), or 22%.

Chiyoda is known as the economic center of Japan; the districts of Otemachi, Marunouchi and Yurakucho east of the palace (an area colloquially known as "Daimaruyu") house the headquarters of 19 Fortune 500 companies, are together the source of roughly 10% of the combined revenue of all Japanese companies With a day population of around 850,000, its day/night population ratio is by far the highest of all municipalities in Japan. Tokyo Station, Tokyo's main inter-city rail terminal and the busiest train station in Japan in terms of scheduled trains, is also located in Chiyoda.

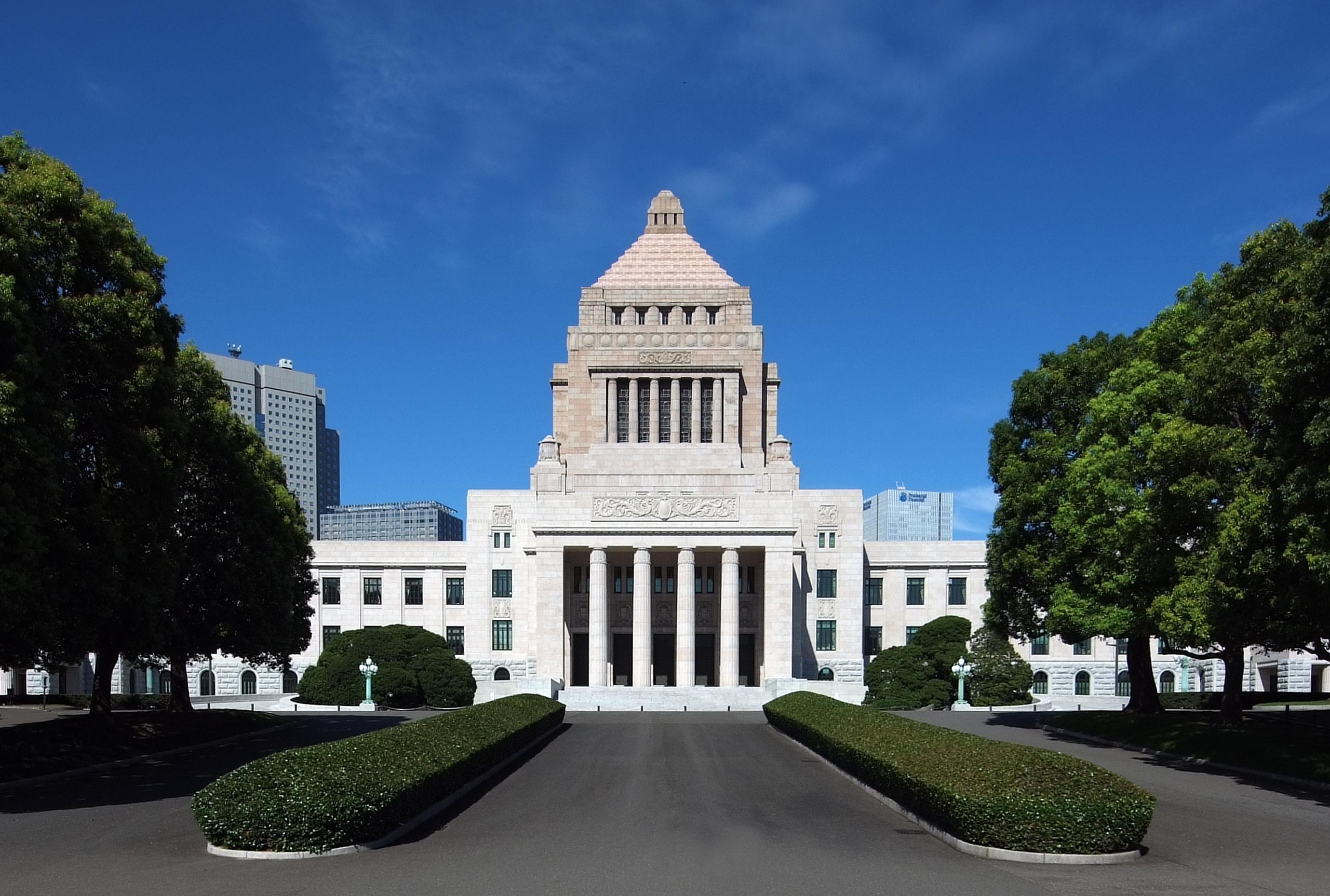
National Diet Building

Chiyoda is also the political center of the country. Chiyoda, literally meaning "field of a thousand generations", inherited the name from the Chiyoda Castle, the other name for Edo Castle, which is the site of the present-day Imperial Palace. With the seat of the Emperor in the Imperial Palace at the ward's center, many government institutions, such as the National Diet, the Prime Minister's Official Residence, the Supreme Court, ministries in Kasumigaseki, and agencies are also located in Chiyoda, as are Tokyo landmarks such as Yasukuni Shrine and the Nippon Budokan. Other notable neighborhoods of Chiyoda include Akihabara, Iidabashi and Kanda.

The ward was formed in 1947 as a merger of Kanda and Kōjimachi wards following Tokyo City's transformation into Tokyo Metropolis. The modern Chiyoda ward exhibits contrasting Shitamachi and Yamanote geographical and cultural divisions. The Kanda area is in the core of Shitamachi, the original commercial center of Edo-Tokyo. On the other hand, the western part of the Kōjimachi area typically represents a Yamanote district.

== History ==
Chiyoda has been a site of a number of historical events.

- In 1860, the assassination of Ii Naosuke took place outside the Sakurada Gate of the Imperial Palace.
- In 1932, assassins attacked and killed prime minister Inukai Tsuyoshi.
- In 1936, an attempted coup d'état, the February 26 Incident, occurred.
- In 1960, Socialist Party leader Inejirō Asanuma was assassinated in Hibiya Hall.
- In 1995, members of Aum Shinrikyo carried out the Tokyo subway sarin attack.

== Geography ==
At the tip of Musashino plateau, Chiyoda is located at the very heart of former Tokyo City in eastern mainland Tokyo. The central area of the ward is furthermore occupied by the Imperial Palace. The east side of the ward, bordering Chūō, is the location of Tokyo Station. The south side, bordering Minato, encompasses Hibiya Park and the National Diet Building. It is almost exclusively occupied by administrations and agencies. The west and northwest are primarily upper class residential; the Yasukuni Shrine is also there. The "high lantern" of Kudanzaka slope was not originally built as a lighthouse, but was built as a lantern for the Shrine. Originally steep and with steps, the slope was considerably softened during remediation after the Kanto earthquake. To the north and northeast of the ward are several residential neighborhoods and the Akihabara commercial district.

== Politics and government ==
=== Local government ===
Chiyoda is run by a directly elected mayor and a city assembly of 25 elected members. The current mayor is Takaaki Higuchi.

=== Metropolitan representation ===
For the Metropolitan Assembly, Chiyoda forms a single-member electoral district. It had been represented by Liberal Democrats for 50 years until the landslide 2009 election when then 26-year-old Democratic newcomer Zenkō Kurishita unseated 70-year-old former Metropolitan Assembly president and six-term assemblyman, Liberal Democrat Shigeru Uchida. In the 2013 election, no Democrat contested the seat and Uchida won back the district against a Communist and two independents.

The Tokyo Fire Department has its headquarters in Ōtemachi in Chiyoda.

=== National representation ===
For the national House of Representatives, Chiyoda, together with Minato and Shinjuku, forms the prefecture's 1st electoral district since the electoral reform of the 1990s. The single-seat constituency is currently represented by Liberal Democrat Miki Yamada.

The ward is also home to the National Diet, the Supreme Court of Japan and the residence of the Prime Minister of Japan and is the political nerve center of Japan.

== Cityscape ==
On December 31, 2001, Chiyoda had 6,572 buildings which were four stories or taller.

Some of the districts in Chiyoda are actually not inhabited, either because they are parks (Hibiya Koen), because they consist only of office buildings (Otemachi or Marunouchi), and/or because they are extremely small. The area on the eastern side of Akihabara Station is the location of several districts that cover at most a few buildings. Kanda-Hanaokachō is, for example, limited to the Akihabara Station and the Yodobashi Camera store. Understanding the address system in the Kanda area can be particularly troublesome for non-locals.

== Districts and neighborhoods ==
=== Kōjimachi area ===
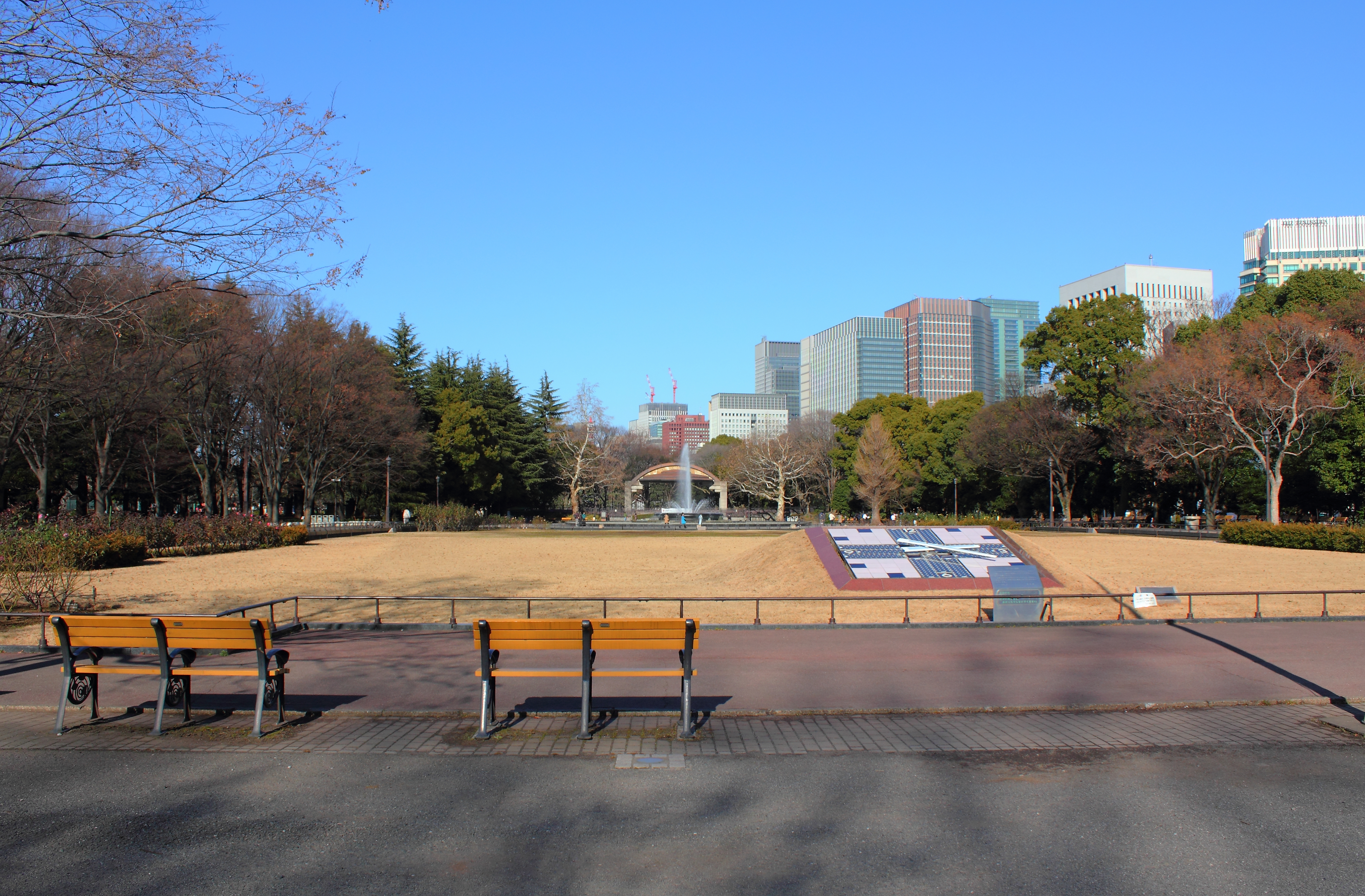
Hibiya Park

- Kōjimachi area (麹町地区), former Kōjimachi Ward (Kōjimachi-ku)
  - Kojimachi, a former merchant area along the Shinjuku-Dori avenue, upper-class residential with a couple of offices. Home to the Portuguese, Irish and Belgian embassies.
  - The Banchō area (nowadays consisting of six neighborhoods, from Ichibancho to Rokubanchō, and historically including Fujimi as well as the western sides of Kudanminami and Kudankita), an upper class residential area, home of the embassies of Belgium, Paraguay, Luxembourg, the UK, Israel and the Apostolic Nunciature.
  - Chiyoda - "1-1 Chiyoda, Chiyoda-ku" is the official address of the Imperial Palace
  - Fujimi, location of the Residence of the Philippine Ambassador to Tokyo, Chongryon, as well as several educational facilities
  - Hayabusachō - Houses the Supreme Court of Japan and the National Theater
  - Hibiya Kōen - Address for Hibiya Park, a large park south of the Imperial Palace
  - Hirakawachō, a mix between residences and medium side offices
  - Iidabashi
  - Kasumigaseki - The nerve center of Japan's administrative agencies
  - Kioichō - The name, ki-o-i, is a three-kanji acronym consisting of one kanji each from the names of the Kishū Domain, Owari Domain, and Ii clan, whose daimyō residences were here during the Edo period
  - Kitanomaru Park, North of the imperial palace, location of the Budokan
  - Kōkyo Gaien - large open gardens in front of the Imperial palace
  - Kudanminami and Kudankita (九段北) districts, around the station of Kudanshita - Northwest side of the Imperial Palace, home to Yasukuni Shrine. It is a prestigious residential and business zone.
  - Marunouchi - Located between Tokyo Station and the Imperial Palace, one of Tokyo's traditional commercial centers
  - Nagatachō - The location of the National Diet; also houses the Hie Shrine
  - Ōtemachi - North of Marunouchi, a district of key financial Japanese institutions and major national newspapers
  - Uchisaiwaichō, close to the Hibiya Park, location of the Imperial Hotel, as well as head offices of banks (especially Mizuho Financial Group).
  - Yūrakuchō - South of Marunouchi, part of the Tokyo Station business district.

=== Kanda area ===
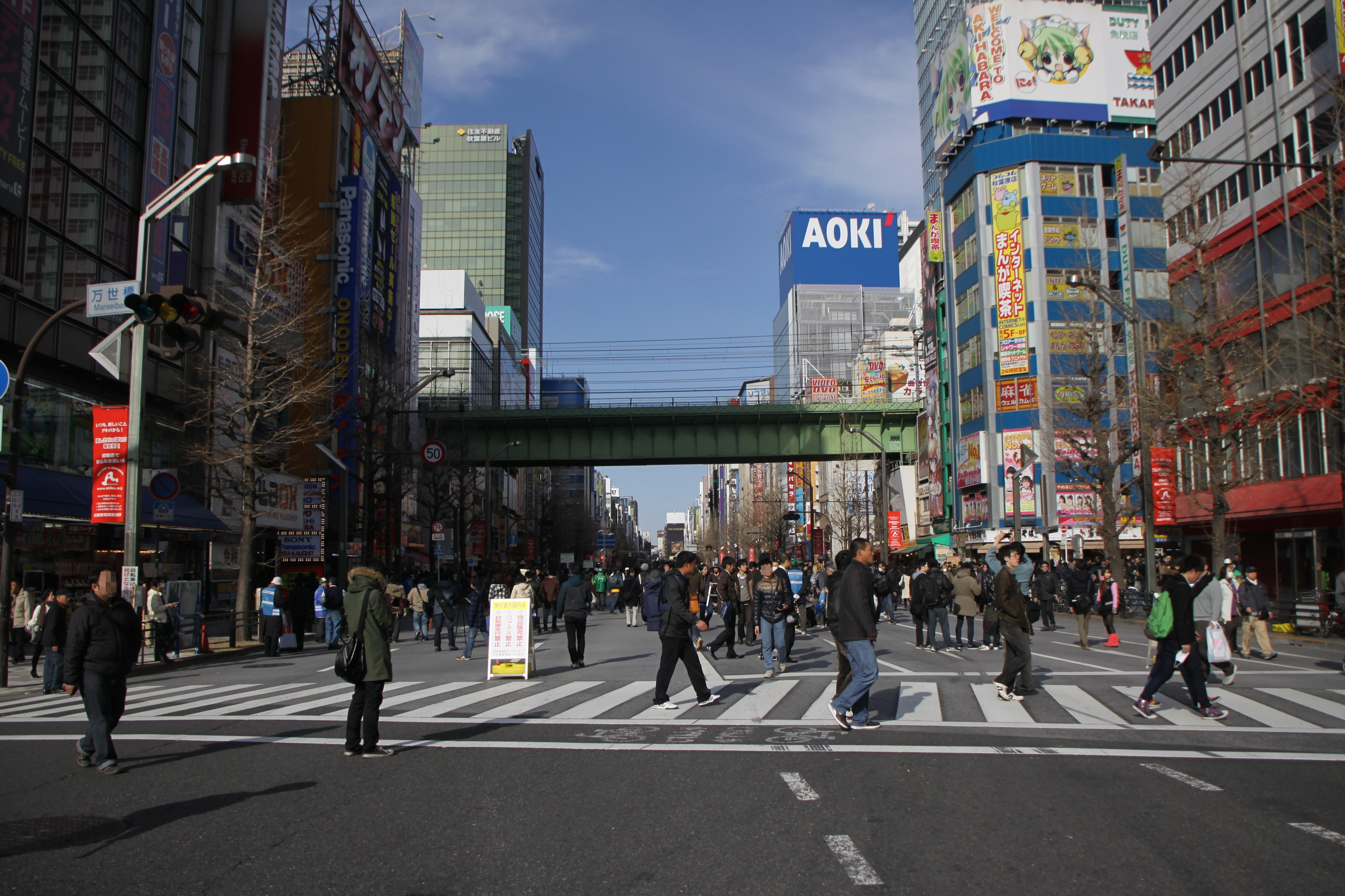
Pedestrian zone in Akihabara

- Kanda area (神田地区; former Kanda Ward (Kanda-ku)). Soto-Kanda, at the northern corner of the ward, home to the famous Akihabara electronics district.
- Uchi-Kanda
- Soto-Kanda
- Nishi-Kanda
- Higashi-Kanda
- Iwamotochō
- Kajichō
- Hitotsubashi

The list below consists of the many smaller neighborhoods of the Kanda area, for which a modernization of the addressing system has not been enforced yet except Kanda-Sarugakuchō and Kanda-Misakichō. All officially start with the prefix "Kanda-", but it is sometimes omitted in daily life. Iwamotochō and Kanda-Iwamotochō are different districts (as is the case for Kajichō and Kanda-Kajichō)

- Kanda-Aioichō
- Kanda-Awajichō
- Kanda-Izumichō
- Kanda-Iwamotochō
- Kanda-Ogawamachi
- Kanda-Kajichō
- Kanda-Kitanorimonochō
- Kanda-Konyachō
- Kanda-Sakumagashi
- Kanda-Sakumachō
- Kanda-Sarugakuchō
- Kanda-Jinbōchō
- Kanda-Sudachō
- Kanda-Surugadai
- Kanda-Tachō
- Kanda-Tsukasamachi
- Kanda-Tomiyamachō
- Kanda-Nishikichō
- Kanda-Nishifukudachō
- Kanda-Neribeichō
- Kanda-Hanaokachō
- Kanda-Higashikonyachō
- Kanda-Higashimatsushitachō
- Kanda-Hirakawachō
- Kanda-Matsunagachō
- Kanda-Mikurachō
- Kanda-Misakichō
- Kanda-Mitoshirochō

== Demographics ==
Per Japanese census data, the population has almost doubled since 2000 after continuous decline.

Historical population
Year	Pop.	±%
1908	185,562	—
1920	217,682	+17.3%
1930	188,687	−13.3%
1940	186,699	−1.1%
1945	44,412	−76.2%
1950	110,348	+148.5%
1960	116,944	+6.0%
1970	74,185	−36.6%
1980	54,801	−26.1%
1990	39,472	−28.0%
2000	36,035	−8.7%
2010	47,115	+30.7%
2020	66,680	+41.5%
Source: Censuses (Note: For populations prior to 1950, the combined data for the two former wards of Kojimachi-ku and Kanda-ku within Tokyo City are calculated.)

== Attractions ==
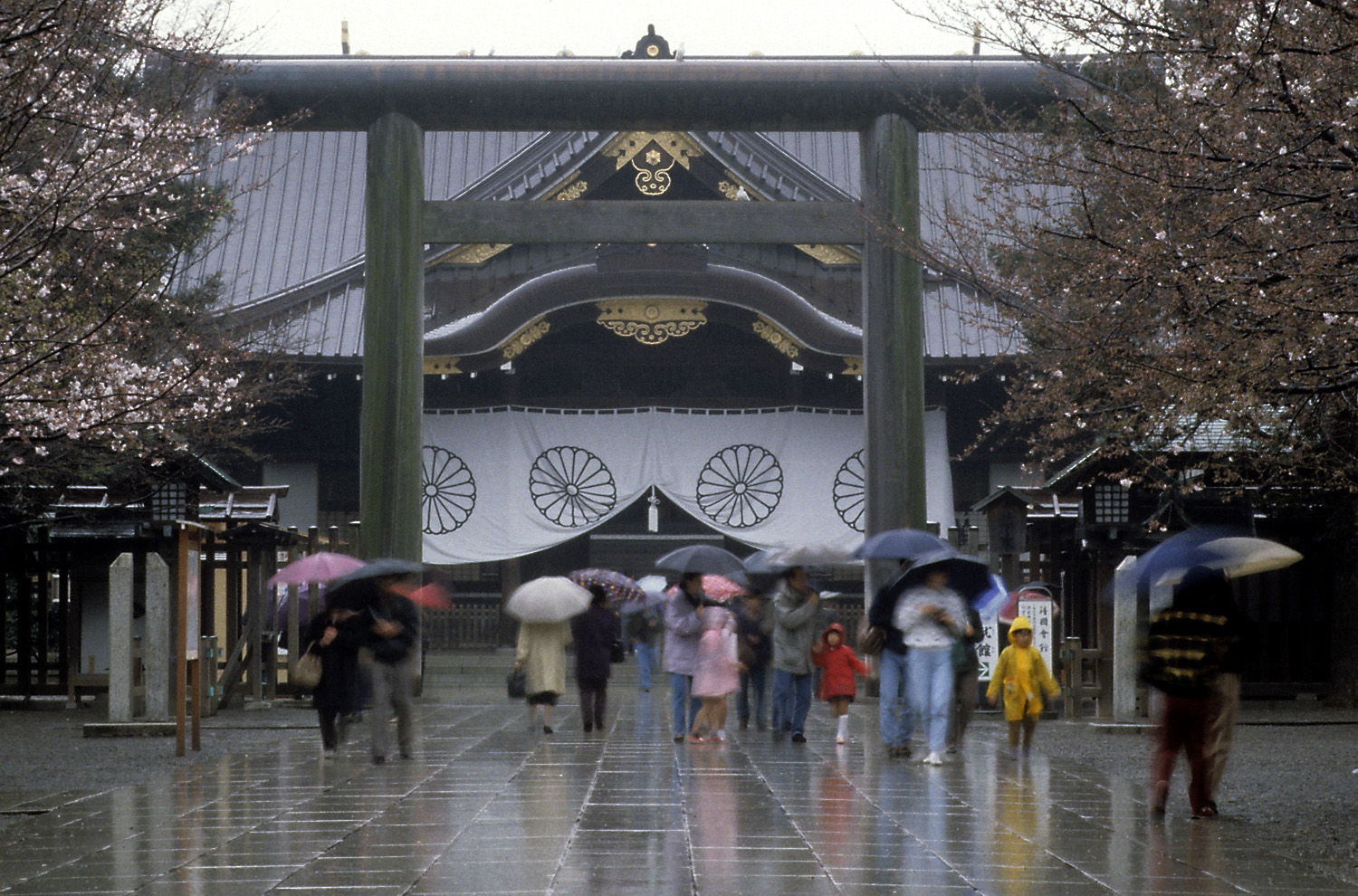
Yasukuni Shrine

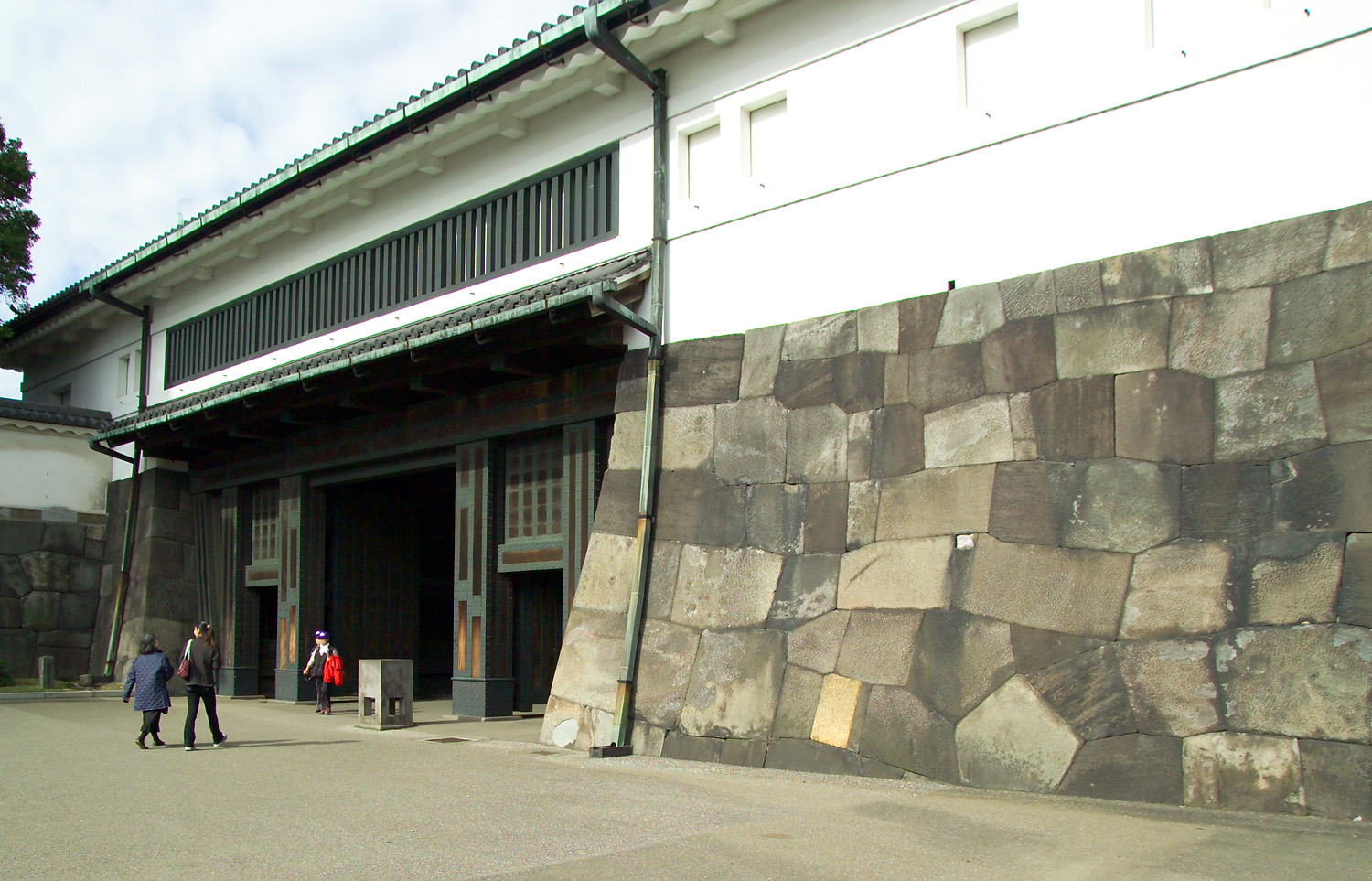
Otemon, the Great Gate of Edo Castle

- Akihabara
- Hibiya Park
- Imperial Palace
- National Diet Building
- Nippon Budokan
- Tokyo International Forum
- Tokyo Station
- Tokyo Takarazuka Theater

== Parks and recreation ==
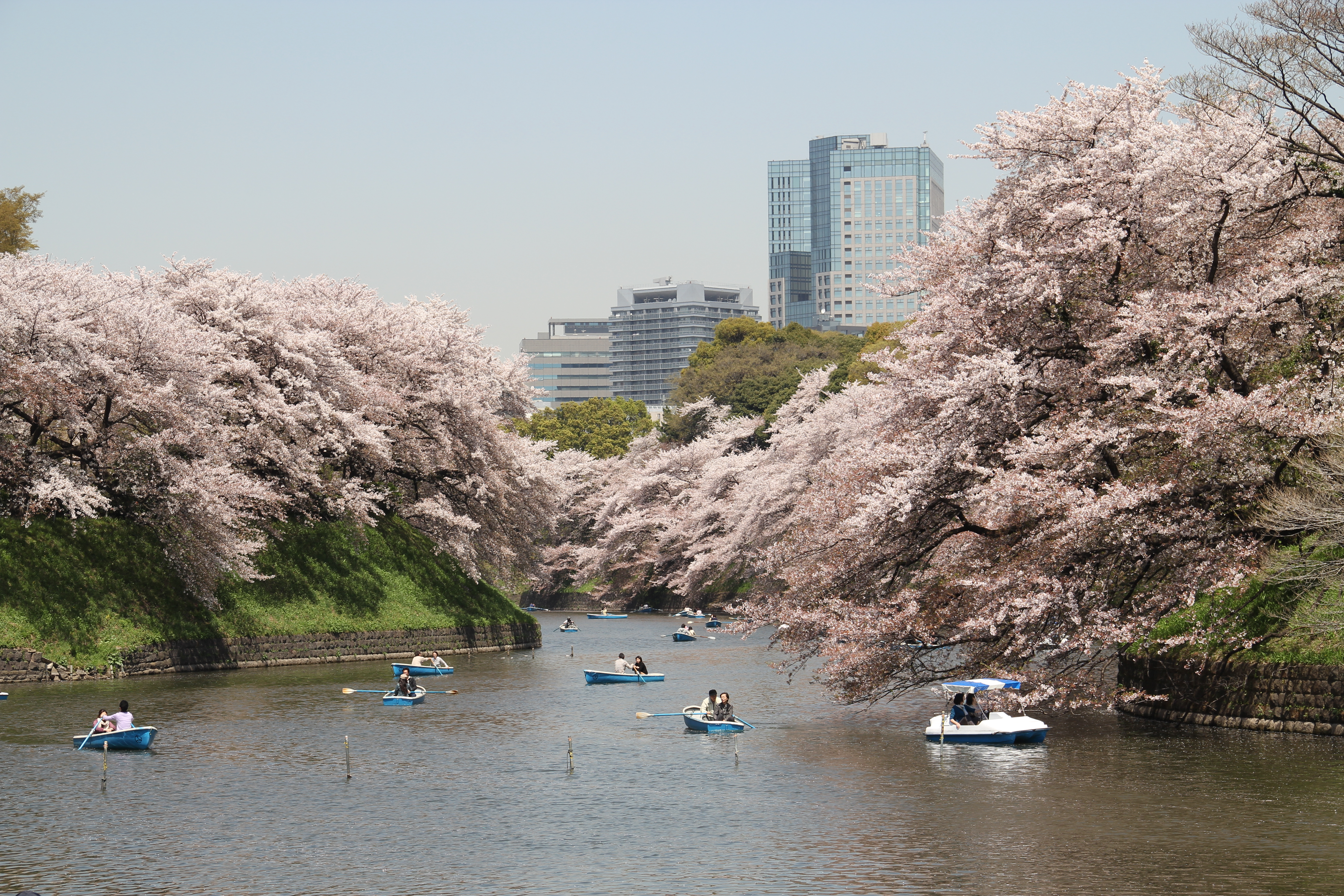
Chidorigafuchi

East Imperial Garden, located on the eastern portion of the Tokyo Imperial Palace grounds and housing the castle tower and the outer defense positions of the former Edo Castle, opened to the public in 1968. Kitanomaru Park, located on Edo Castle's former northern section, has the Tokyo National Museum of Modern Art and the Nippon Budokan, a venue for performances. Chidorigafuchi Boat Arena and Chidorigafuchi Moat Path includes a waterway for boats. National Diet Building Park, located adjacent to the Diet Building and divided in two by a street, includes American dogwoods planted to symbolize the relations between the United States and Japan. Hibiya Park, Japan's first western-style park, includes restaurants, open-air concert halls, and tennis courts. Imperial Palace Outer Garden, in the front of Nijubashi Bridge, serves as a jogging trail and a tourist site.

== Points of historical interest ==
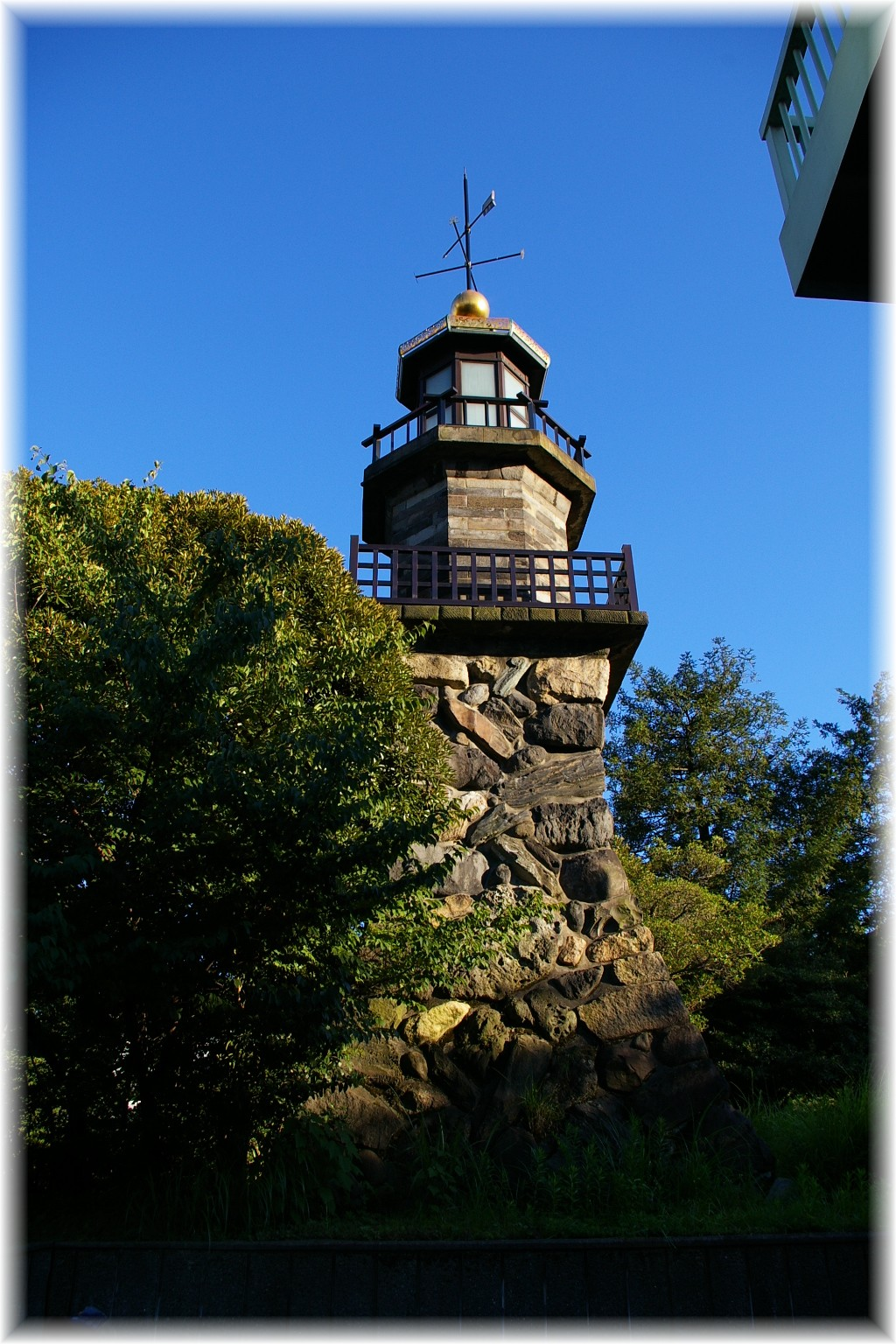
Kudan lighthouse

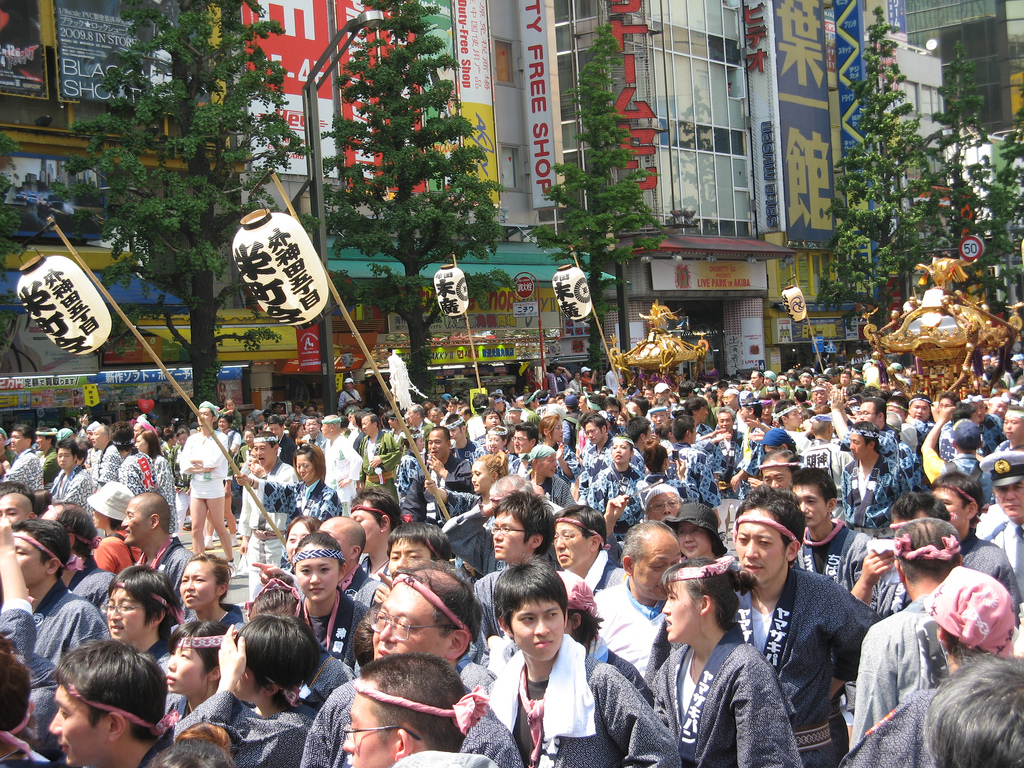
Kanda Festival

== Economy ==
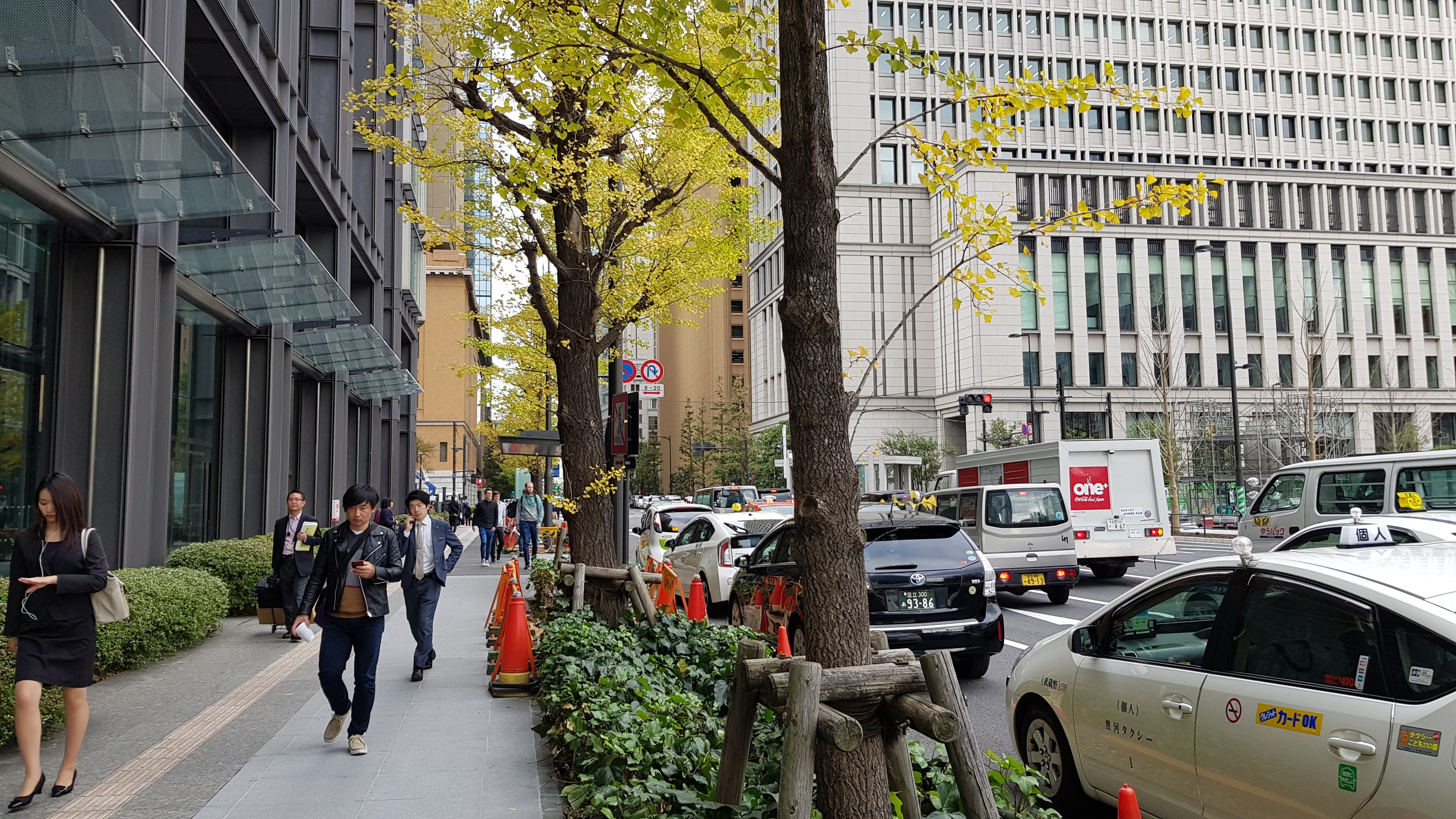
Chiyoda office buildings street level

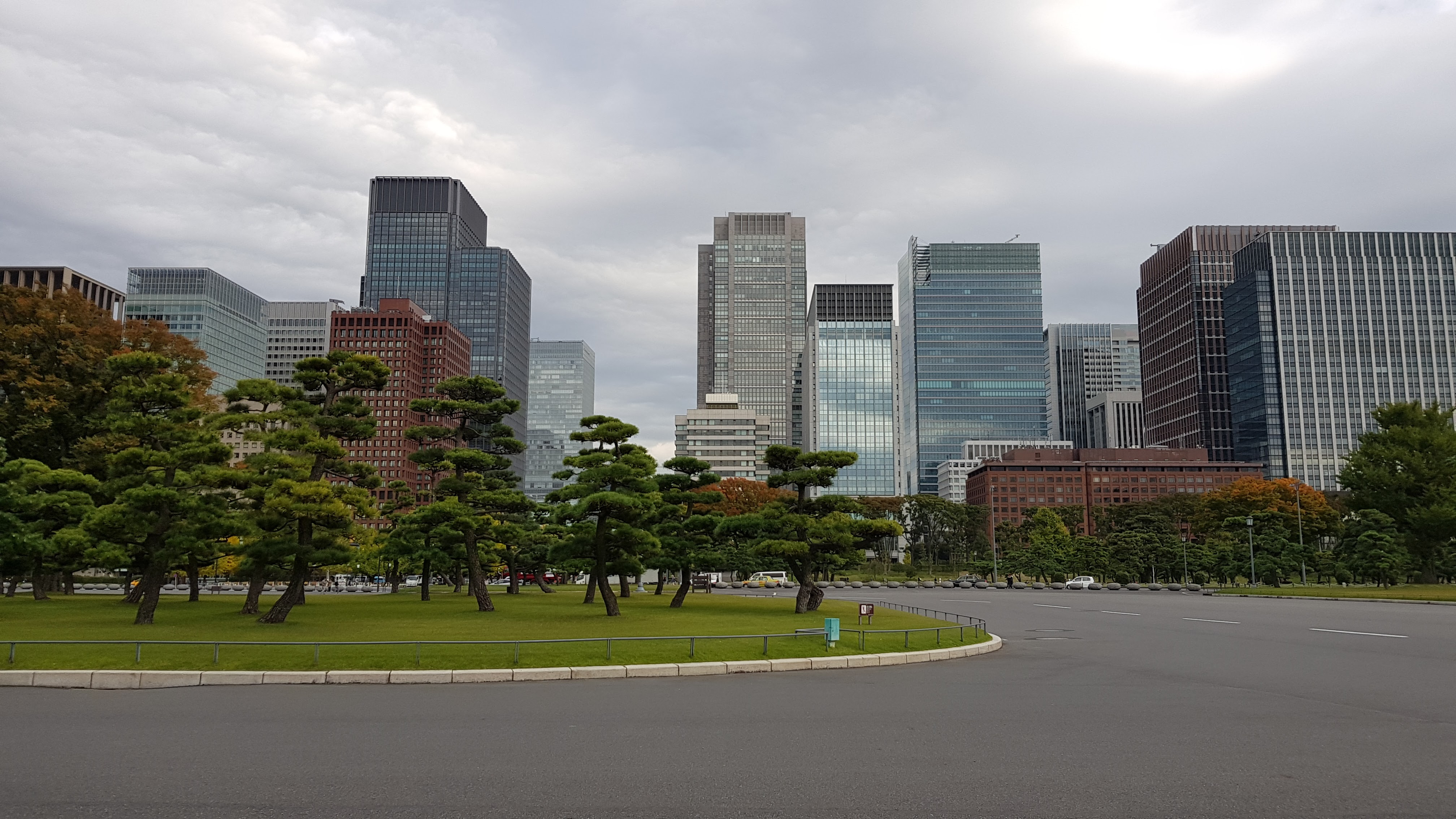
Chiyoda office buildings from the Imperial Palace Outer Garden

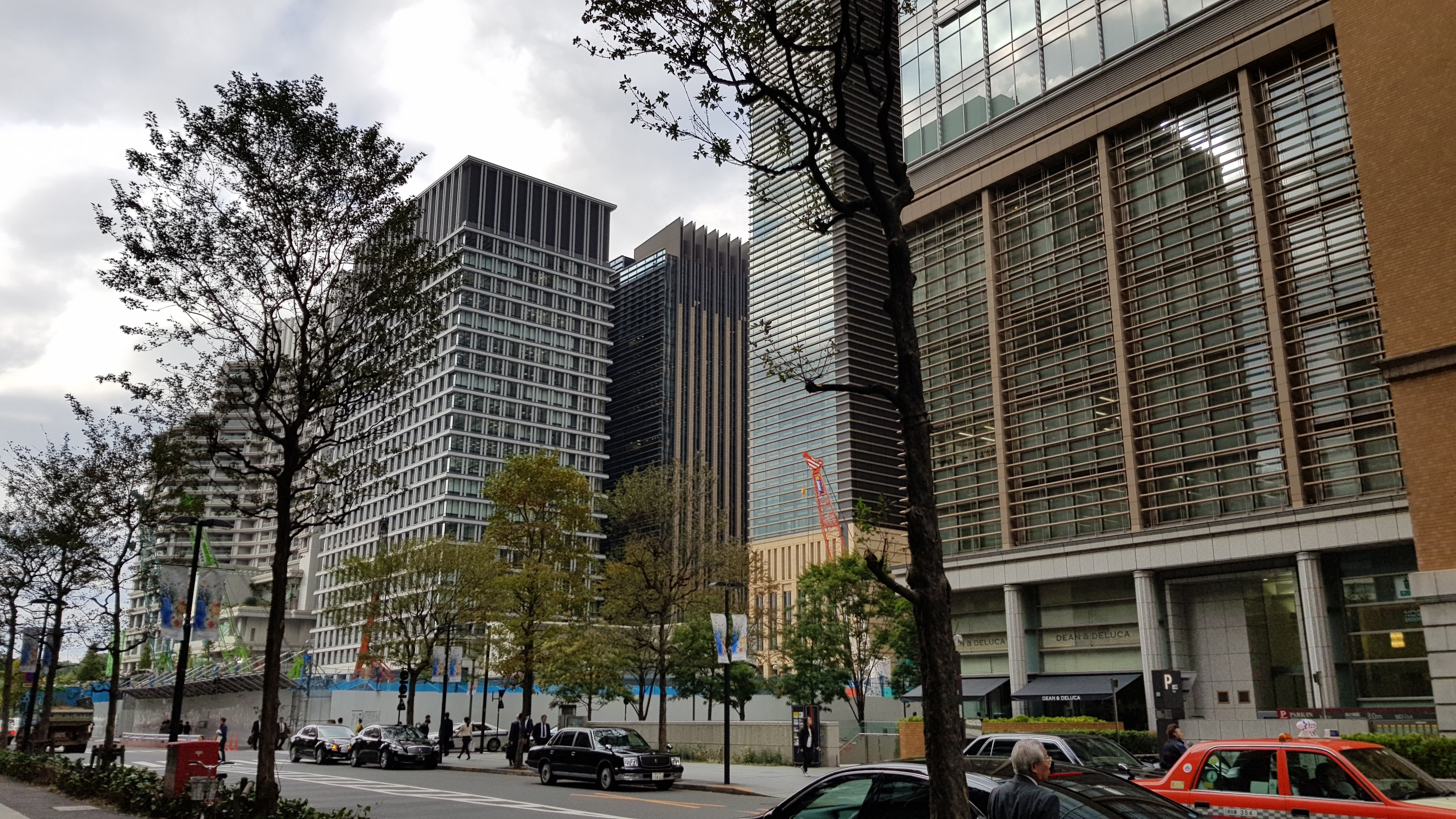
Chiyoda office buildings

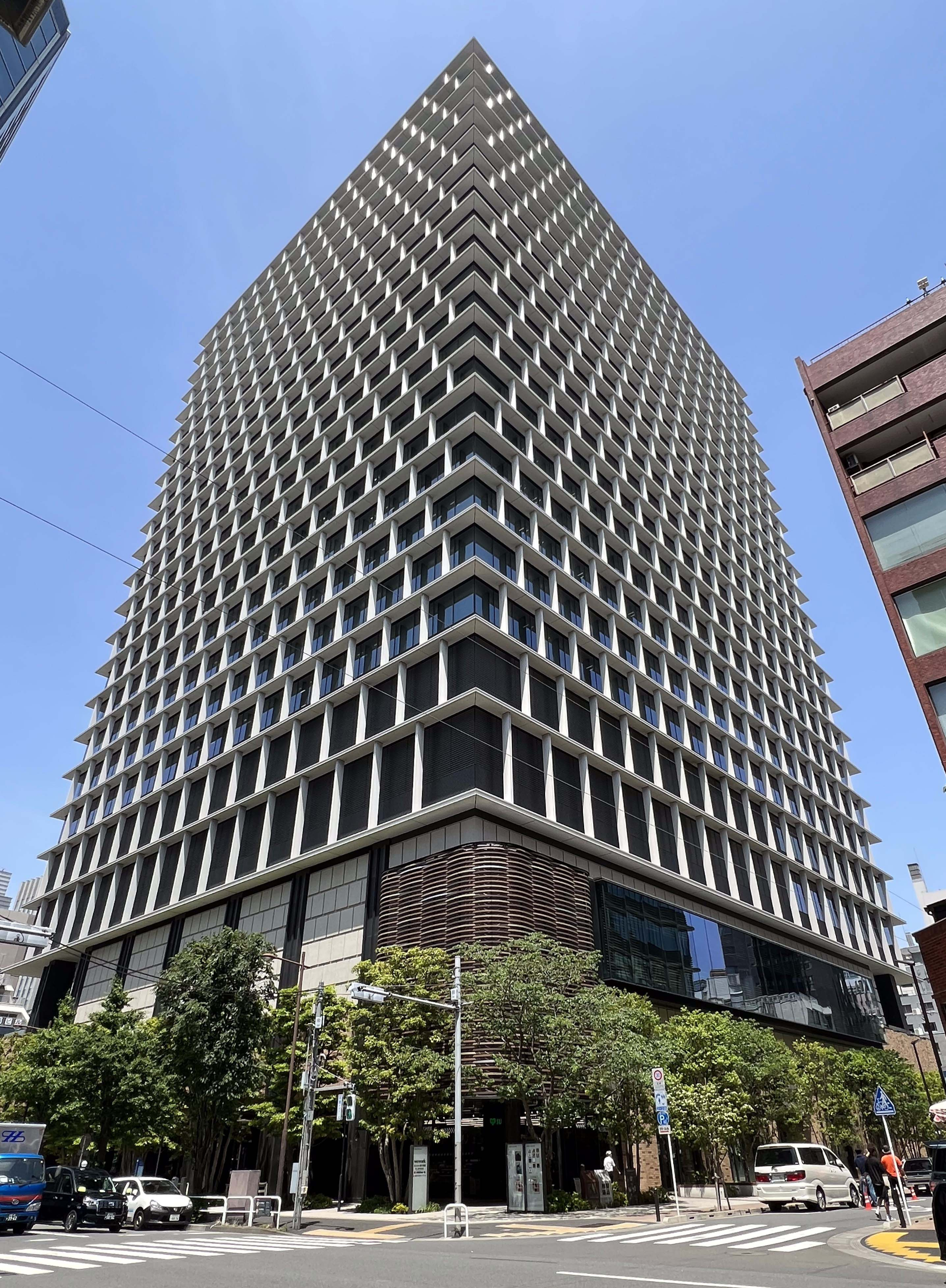
KANDA SQUARE

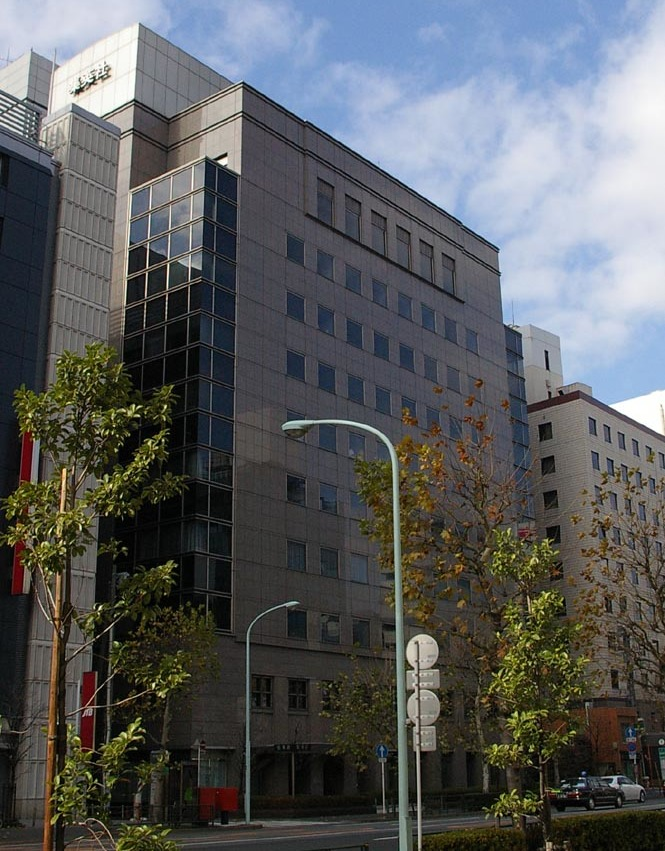
Shueisha headquarters

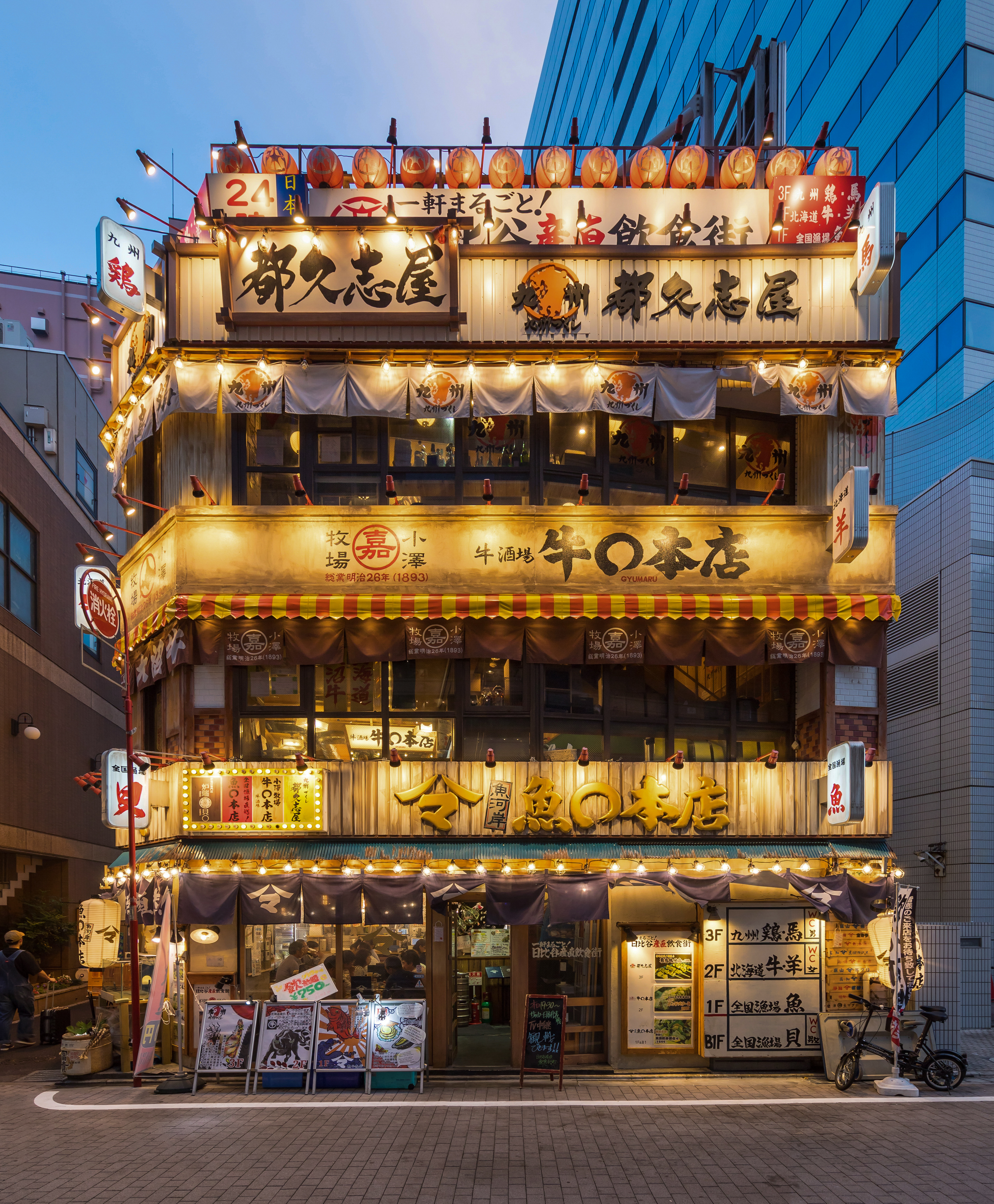
Illuminated facade of a 3-storey restaurant in Chiyoda

On October 1, 2001, Chiyoda had 36,233 business establishments with 888,149 employees.

0verflow, Asahi Glass, Bungeishunjū, Calbee, Creatures Inc., Datam Polystar, DIC Corporation, Dowa Holdings, Furukawa Electric, HAL Laboratory, Hakusensha, Jaleco, The Japan FM Network Company, Japan Freight Railway Company, Japan Post Holdings, JFE Holdings, Kadokawa Corporation, KDDI, Konica Minolta, Kyowa Hakko Kirin, Lixil Group Corporation, Maeda Corporation, Mitsubishi Estate, MCDecaux, Mitsubishi UFJ Financial Group, Mizuho Financial Group, Nabtesco, Nakano Corporation, New Otani, Nikken Sekkei, Nippon Cable, Nippon Flour Mills, Nippon Paper Industries, Nippon Soda, Nippon Suisan Kaisha, Nitto Boseki, NTT docomo, Orient Watch Company, Seibu Kaihatsu, Seven & i Holdings, Shin-Etsu Chemical, Shogakukan, Shueisha, SMC Corporation, Sony Music Entertainment Japan, Tanaka Kikinzoku Group, Toho, Toho Zinc, Tokio Marine Nichido, Tokuyama Corporation, Tokyo FM, Toppan Printing, Ushio, Inc., Yamazaki Baking Company, Vie de France, YKK Group, and Yomiuri Shimbun are headquartered in Chiyoda. Mazda has an office in Chiyoda.

=== Foreign operations ===
Foreign companies with Japanese divisions in Chiyoda include Aeroméxico, AMI Japan (subsidiary of American Megatrends), Chloé Japan, Hewlett-Packard Japan, LVMH, Ropes & Gray, Sidley Austin, Sunoco, and Swiss International Air Lines.

=== Former operations ===
Japanese companies which formerly had their headquarters in Chiyoda include All Nippon Airways, Bandai Visual, Galaxy Airlines, Japan Airlines, Japan Asia Airways, Mitsui Chemicals, Nippon Cargo Airlines, Taito, and Yamato Life. In 1998 Fujitsu operated a branch office in Chiyoda. At one point, Cantor Fitzgerald had an office in Chiyoda.

== Transportation ==
Home to Tokyo station, with a multitude of subways, railways and long-distance services.

== Education ==
=== Primary and secondary schools ===
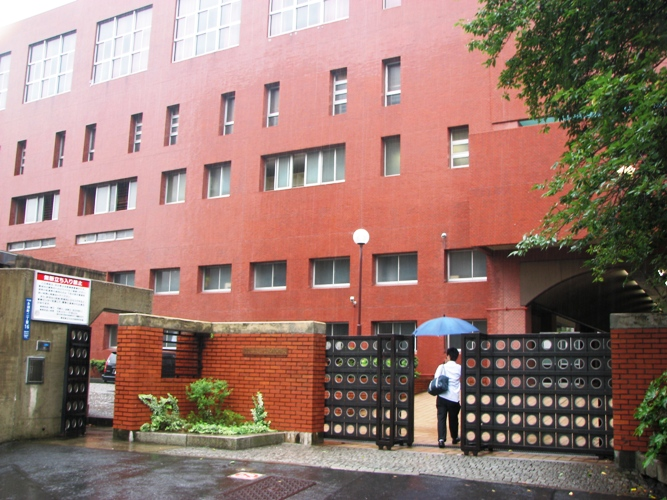
Hibiya High School

As of 1 May 2003, Chiyoda has eight elementary schools, with 2,647 students, and five junior high schools with 1,123 students. Public elementary, junior high schools and Kudan Secondary School in Chiyoda are operated by the Chiyoda City (the Chiyoda Ward) Board of Education. Public high schools are operated by the Tokyo Metropolitan Government Board of Education.

==== Public schools ====
Prefectural high schools

- Hibiya High School
- Hitotsubashi High School

Municipal secondary (junior-senior high) schools

- Kudan Secondary School - Kudankita

Municipal junior high schools

- Kōjimachi Junior High School (麹町中学校) - Hirakawachō
- Kanda-Hitotsubashi Junior High School (神田一橋中学校) - Hitotsubashi

There is a freedom of choice system for junior high schools in Chiyoda Ward, and so there are no specific junior high school attendance zones.

Municipal elementary schools

- Banchō Elementary School (番町小学校) - Rokubanchō
- Chiyoda Elementary School (千代田小学校) - Tsukasamachi
  - It was created in April 1993 (Heisei 5) as a merger of Chisakura Elementary School (千桜小学校) and Kanda Elementary School (神田小学校), and it also took a portion of the former boundary of Nagatatcho Elementary School (永田町小学校).
- Fujimi Elementary School (富士見小学校) - Fujimi
- Izumi Elementary School (和泉小学校) - Izumichō
  - Established in 1993, it is a consolidation of Imagawa Elementary School (今川小学校) and Sakuma Elementary School (佐久間小学校).
- Kudan Elementary School (九段小学校) - Sanbanchō
- Kōjimachi Elementary School (麹町小学校) - Kōjimachi
  - It was formed from the merger of the former Kōjimachi Elementary and Nagatacho Elementary School (永田町小学校).
- Ochanomizu Elementary School (お茶の水小学校) - Fujimi
  - It was created in 1993 as the merger of Kinka Elementary School (錦華小学校), Nishikanda Elementary School (西神田小学), and Ogawa Elementary School (小川小学校). The Kinka building became the Ochanomizu Elementary building.
- Shohei Elementary School (昌平小学校) - Sotokanda
  - It was established in 1993. It is on the site of the former Horin Elementary School (芳林小学校). It was initially held in the previous Awaji Elementary School (淡路小学校) before its current building opened in 1996.

==== Private schools ====
Primary and secondary schools

- The Tokyo Chinese School, located in Gobanchō
- Previously the Lycée Franco-Japonais de Tokyo was in Fujimi in this ward.

Secondary schools

- Chiyoda Jo-Gakuen Junior and Senior High School, private girls' school
- Kanda Jo-Gakuen Junior and Senior High School, private girls' school
- Kyōritsu Joshi Junior and Senior High School, private girls' school, affiliated with Kyoritsu Women's University
- Futaba Gakuen Junior and Senior High School, private girls' school
- Joshigakuin Junior and Senior High School, private girls' school
- Miwada Gakuen Junior and Senior High School, private girls' school founded by Masako Miwada
- Ōtsuma Junior and Senior High School, private girls' school, affiliated with Otsuma Women's University
- Shirayuri Joshi Gakuen Junior and Senior High School, private girls' school, affiliated with Shirayuri Women's University
- Wayō Kudan Joshi Gakuen Junior and Senior High School, private girls' school, affiliated with Wayo Women's University
- Gyosei Junior and Senior High School, private boys' school
- Seisoku Gakuen Senior High School, private boys' school
- Kinjō Gakuen Senior High School
- Tōyō Senior High School
- Nishōgakusha Senior High School, affiliated with Nishogakusha University

Primary schools

- Gyosei Primary School (暁星小学校), boys' school
- Futaba Gakuen Elementary School (雙葉小学校), girls' school
- Shirayuri Joshi Gakuen Elementary School (白百合学園小学校), girls' school, affiliated with Shirayuri Women's University

=== Colleges and universities ===
Hitotsubashi University's Graduate School of International Corporate Strategy is located in the National Center of Sciences in Hitotsubashi. Both of the Sophia University Campuses are in western Chiyoda. The main Yotsuya campus lies adjacent to Yotsuya Station and the Ichigaya Campus just south of Ichigaya Station.

Globis University Graduate School of Management which is the largest business school in Japan is also located in Chiyoda. Hosei University, Meiji University, Senshu University, Nihon University and so on are located in the area.

=== Libraries ===
Chiyoda operates four public libraries; they are the Chiyoda Library, Yobancho Library, Shohei Library, and Kanda Library. Tokyo operates the Tokyo Metropolitan Library Hibiya Library. The Japanese government operates the National Diet Library and the National Archives. Ishikawa Enterprise Foundation Ochanomizu Library is a nearby private library.

== Diplomatic missions ==
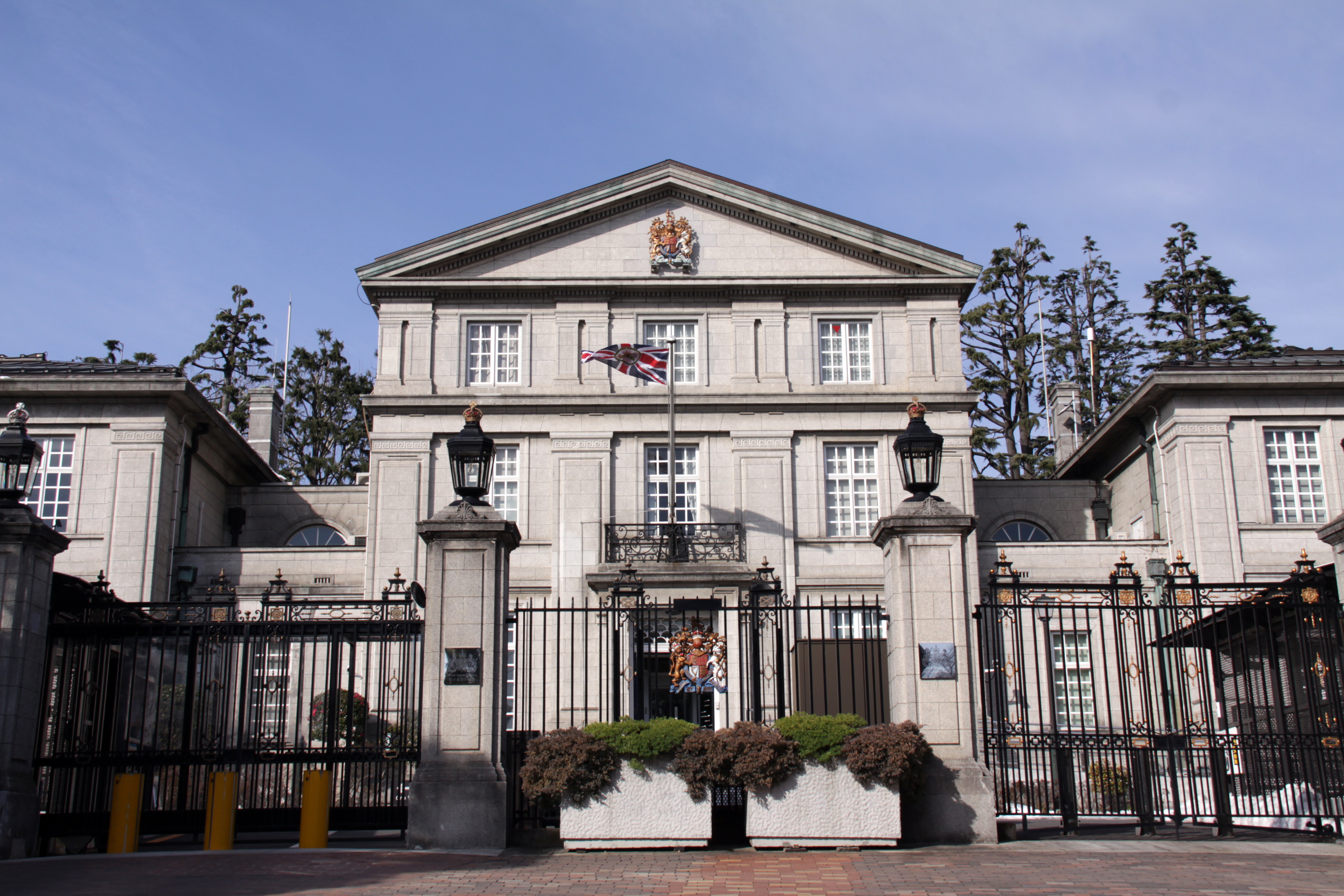
Embassy of the United Kingdom, Tokyo

Several countries operate their embassies in Chiyoda.

- Bangladesh
- Belgium
- East Timor
- Holy See
- India
- Ireland
- Israel
- Luxembourg
- Mexico
- North Korea (Chongryon)
- Palestine
- Paraguay
- South Africa
- Tunisia
- United Kingdom
