= Kanda-Hirakawachō =

District of Chiyoda, Tokyo, Japan

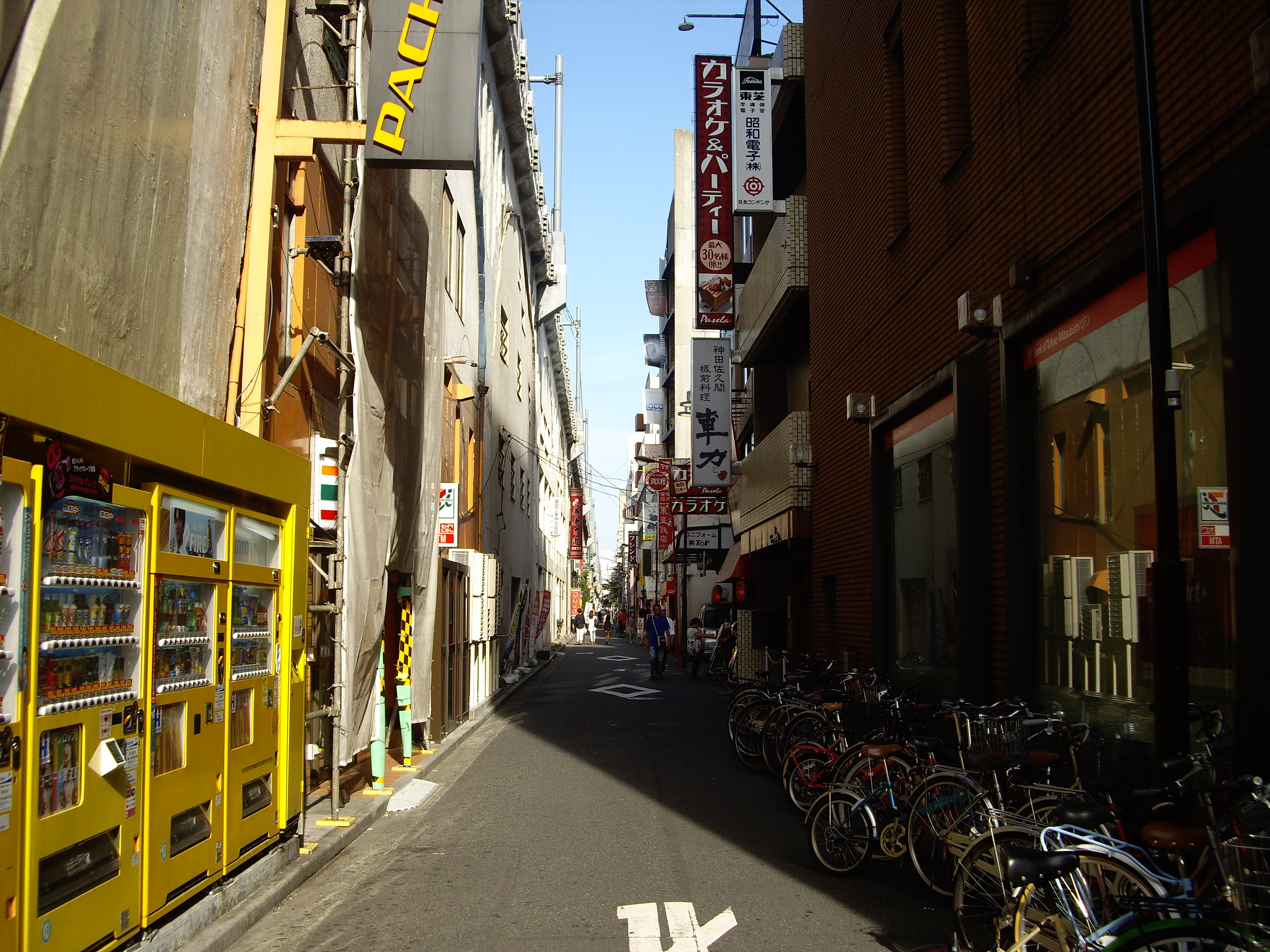
Kanda-hirakawacho Chiyoda-ward

Kanda-Hirakawachō (神田平河町) is a district of Chiyoda, Tokyo, Japan. As of April 1, 2007, its population is 16. Its postal code is 101-0027.

Kanda-Hirakawachō is located in the northeastern part of the Chiyoda ward. It borders Kanda-Sakumachō 2-chōme to the north, east and south. It borders Kanda-Sakumachō 1-chōme to the west, the Showa-Dōri Avenue forming its western boundary.

== Education ==
Chiyoda Board of Education operates public elementary and junior high schools. Izumi Elementary School (千代田区立和泉小学校) is the zoned elementary school for Kanda-Hirakawachō. There is a freedom of choice system for junior high schools in Chiyoda Ward. So there are no specific junior high school zones.
