= Matsunagachō, Tokyo =

District of Chiyoda, Tokyo, Japan

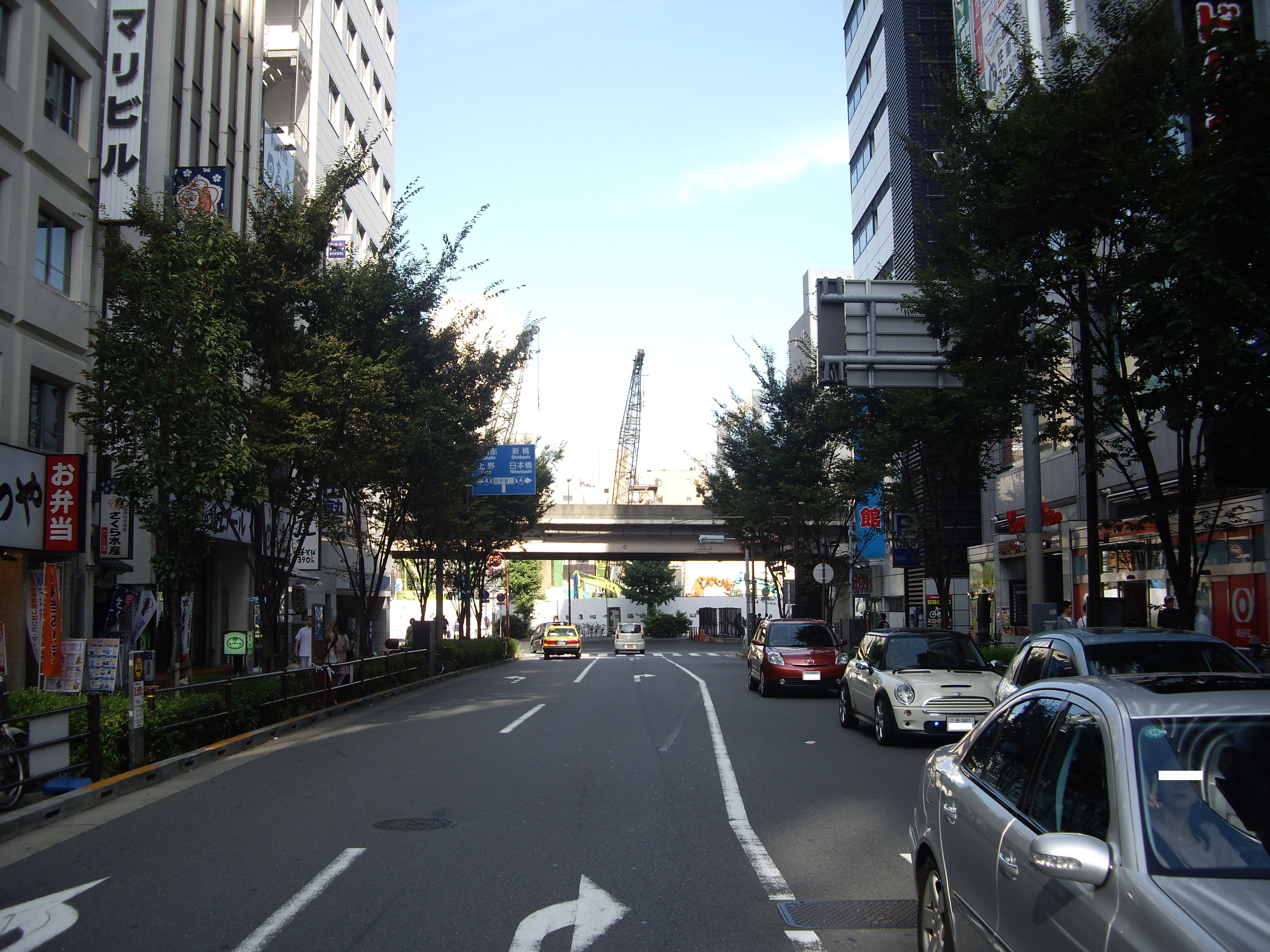
Kanda-Matsunagachō, Chiyoda, Tokyo.

Matsunagachō (松永町), officially Kanda-Matsunagachō (神田松永町), is a district of Chiyoda, Tokyo, Japan. As of April 1, 2007, its population is 80. Its postal code is 101-0023.

Kanda-Matsunagachō is located on the northeastern part of Chiyoda. It borders Akihabara, Taitō to the north; Taitō, Taitō and Kanda-Izumichō, Chiyoda to the east; Kanda-Sakumachō to the south; Kanda-Hanaokachō to the southwest; and Kanda-Aioichō and Kanda-Neribeichō to the west.

While no station is located within Matsunagachō, the Akihabara Station is located to the south of the district.

== Education ==
Chiyoda Board of Education operates public elementary and junior high schools. Izumi Elementary School (和泉小学校) is the zoned elementary school for Kanda-Matsunagachō. There is a freedom of choice system for junior high schools in Chiyoda Ward, and so there are no specific junior high school zones.
