= Hitotsubashi Group =

Publishing keiretsu

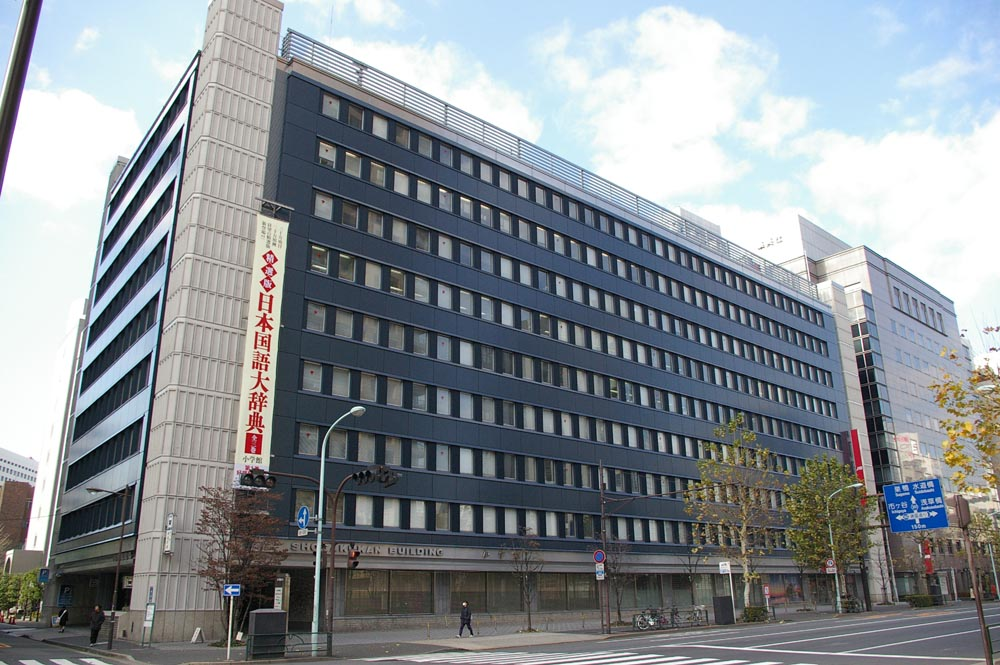
- The exteriors of Shogakukan and Shueisha's main headquarters in Chiyoda, Tokyo, Japan
- Native name: 一ツ橋グループ
- Romanized name: Hitotsubashi Gurūpu
- Type: Private
- Industry: Publishing
- Founder: Takeo Ōga
- Headquarters: Tokyo, Japan
- Area served: Japan
- Owner: Ōga family
- Divisions: Shogakukan-Shueisha Productions; Shodensha; Viz Media; Viz Productions; VME PLB SAS
- Subsidiaries: Shueisha; Shogakukan; Hakusensha (all via Shogakukan-Shueisha Productions)

The Hitotsubashi Group (一ツ橋グループ, Hitotsubashi Gurūpu) is a Japanese family-owned publishing vertical keiretsu in Hitotsubashi, Chiyoda, Tokyo. It is composed of Shogakukan, Shueisha, Hakusensha and related publishing companies. The name of the group is derived from the location of its major members' headquarters in the Hitotsubashi area of Tokyo. The group companies are mostly run by the Ōga family, whose influence in the companies is still strong today.

It was started when Shogakukan, which was focused mainly on educational magazines and other related publishing at the time, decided to spin off a company (Shueisha) to produce entertainment (especially manga) magazines. Eventually, Shogakukan moved into the entertainment business as well, and became a rival of Shueisha, and the group was formed to help each one grow. The headquarters buildings for Shogakukan and Shueisha are right next to each other.

== Associated companies ==
- Hakusensha
- Hero's Inc (shareholder via Shogakukan Creative)
- President
- Remow
- Shodensha
- Shogaku Tosho
- Shogakukan
- Shogakukan-Shueisha Productions (ShoPro)
- Shorinsha
- Shotsu
- Showa Tosho
- Shueisha
- Viz Media
- Viz Productions
- VME PLB SAS
