= Hanaokachō, Tokyo =

District of Chiyoda, Tokyo, Japan

Coordinates: 35.6987°N 139.7739°E

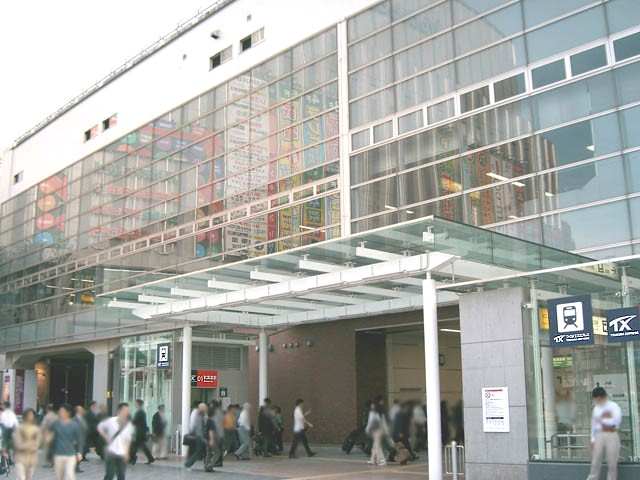
Akihabara Station

Hanaokachō (花岡町), or officially Kanda-Hanaokachō (神田花岡町), is a district of Chiyoda, Tokyo, Japan. As of April 1, 2007, the population of this district is 0.

Kanda-Hanaokachō is located on the northeastern part of the Chiyoda ward. It borders Kanda-Aioichō and Kanda-Matsunagachō to the north, Kanda-Sakumachō to the east and south, and Soto-Kanda 1-chōme to the west.

This district houses the JR Line Akihabara Station, the bus traffic circle in front of the station, the Tsukuba Express Akihabara Station, atré vie (the department store adjacent to the Akihabara Station and owned by the JR East), and the Yodobashi-Akiba commercial complex. Note that Yodobashi-Akiba's site is partly located on Kanda-Matsunagachō, too.

== Education ==
Chiyoda Board of Education operates public elementary and junior high schools. Izumi Elementary School (和泉小学校) is the zoned elementary school for Kanda-Hanaokachō. There is a freedom of choice system for junior high schools in Chiyoda Ward, and so there are no specific junior high school zones.
