= Kanda-Neribeichō, Tokyo =

District of Chiyoda, Tokyo, Japan

Coordinates: 35.7006076°N 139.7740947°E

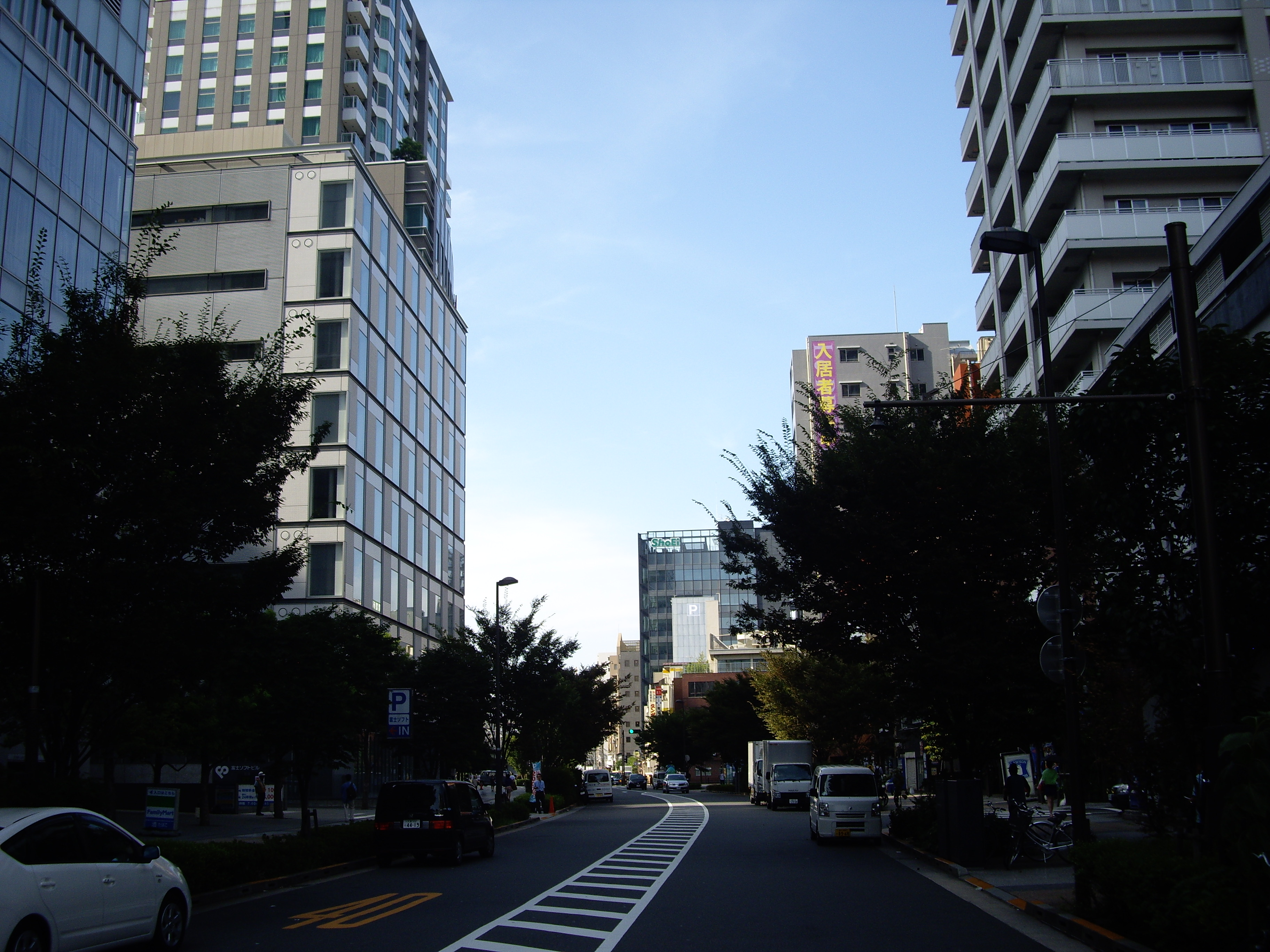
Kanda-neribeicho Chiyoda-ward

Neribeichō (練塀町), officially Kanda-Neribeichō (神田練塀町), is a district of Chiyoda, Tokyo, Japan. As April 1, 2007, its population is 246. Its postal code is 101-0022.

Kanda-Neribeichō is located on the northeastern part of Chiyoda. It borders Akihabara, Taitō to the north, Kanda-Matsunagachō to the east, Kanda-Aioichō, and Soto-Kanda to the west.

Located to the north of the Akihabara Station, Neribeichō is home to several skyscrapers including Fujisoft Akihabara Building (富士ソフト秋葉原ビル) and Park Tower Akihabara (パークタワー秋葉原).

== Education ==
Chiyoda Board of Education operates public elementary and junior high schools. Izumi Elementary School (和泉小学校) is the zoned elementary school for Kanda-Neribeichō. There is a freedom of choice system for junior high schools in Chiyoda Ward, and so there are no specific junior high school zones.
