= Kanda-Aioichō, Tokyo =

District of Chiyoda, Tokyo, Japan

Coordinates: 35.698°N 139.773°E

Aioichō (相生町), or officially Kanda-Aioichō (神田相生町) is a district of Chiyoda, Tokyo, Japan.

The closest stations are the Tsukuba Express' Akihabara Station, accessible in Kanda-Hanaokachō via exit A3 inside the Yodobashi Camera building, and JR East's Akihabara Station, via its Central gate in Kanda-Hanaokachō and Electric Town gate on the Soto-Kanda side to the west.

Kanda-Myōjin-dōri street (神田明神通り) cuts through the district from west to east. There is only one office building fully contained within Aioichō: the "Akihabara Center Place" building, on the south side of the street. While the area of Aioichō district covers part of the "Daitō building" to the north, its address is registered in Kanda-Neribeichō. The west side of the Aioichō is completely covered by overhead train tracks.

== Adjacent districts ==
- Kanda-Neribeichō - North
- Kanda-Matsunagachō - East
- Kanda-Hanaokachō - South
- Soto-Kanda - West

== Education ==
Chiyoda Board of Education operates public elementary and junior high schools. Izumi Elementary School (和泉小学校) is the zoned elementary of Kanda-Aoichō. There is a freedom of choice system for junior high schools in Chiyoda Ward, and so there are no specific junior high school zones.
