= Hitotsubashi, Chiyoda =

District of Chiyoda, Tokyo, Japan

Coordinates: 35°41′35″N 139°45′26″E

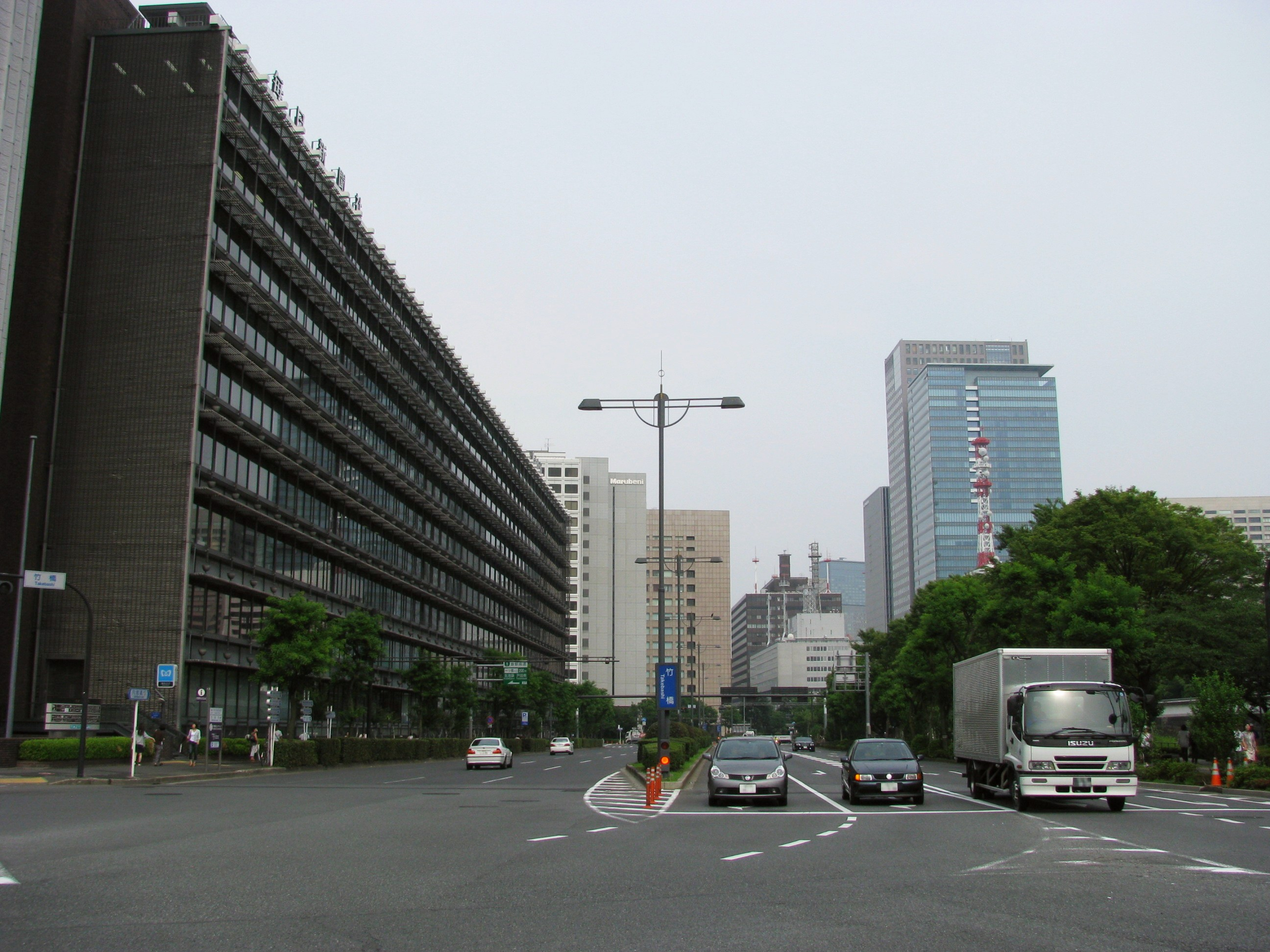
A street in Hitotsubashi.

Hitotsubashi (一ツ橋; Japanese pronunciation: [çi̥.to.tsɯ.ba.ɕi] (Note: This unaccented pronunciation applies to the bridge's name, the placename, and the elliptical name of Hitotsubashi University, all in Tokyo, reflecting a trend of unaccented placenames in Tokyo. The original common noun this name derives from, 一つ橋, meaning "single-log bridge", is pronounced with an accent as [çi̥.to.tsɯꜜ.ba.ɕi].)) is an administrative and postal area of Chiyoda, Tokyo, Japan. It was formerly Kanda-ku.

Many establishments are located in Hitotsubashi. In Hitotsubashi 1-chōme are the headquarters of the Mainichi Shimbun. In 2-chōme are Hitotsubashi University Chiyoda Campus, Josuikaikan Hall, alumni hall of Hitotsubashi University, Kyoritsu Women's University, Iwanami Shoten, Shogakukan, and Shueisha, as well as Hitotsubashi Group.

== Education ==
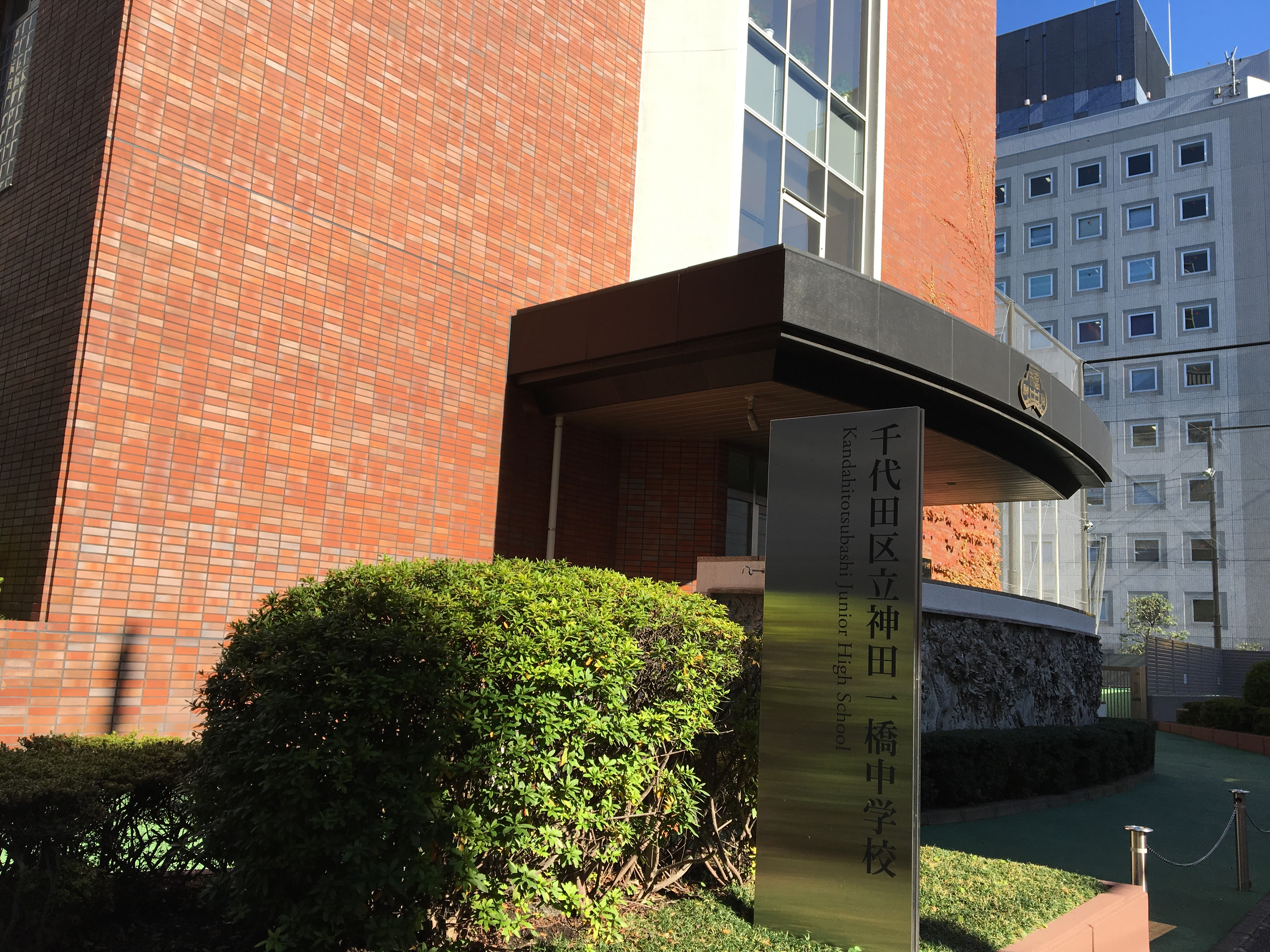
Chiyoda Kanda Hitotsubashi Junior High School (千代田区立神田一橋中学校)

Chiyoda Board of Education operates public elementary and junior high schools. Ochanomizu Elementary School (お茶の水小学校) is the zoned elementary school for Hitotsubashi 1-2 chōme.

There is a freedom of choice system for junior high schools in Chiyoda Ward, and so there are no specific junior high school zones. Chiyoda Ward operates Chiyoda Kanda Hitotsubashi Junior High School (千代田区立神田一橋中学校) in Hitotsubashi.
