= Higashi-Kanda =

District of Chiyoda, Tokyo, Japan

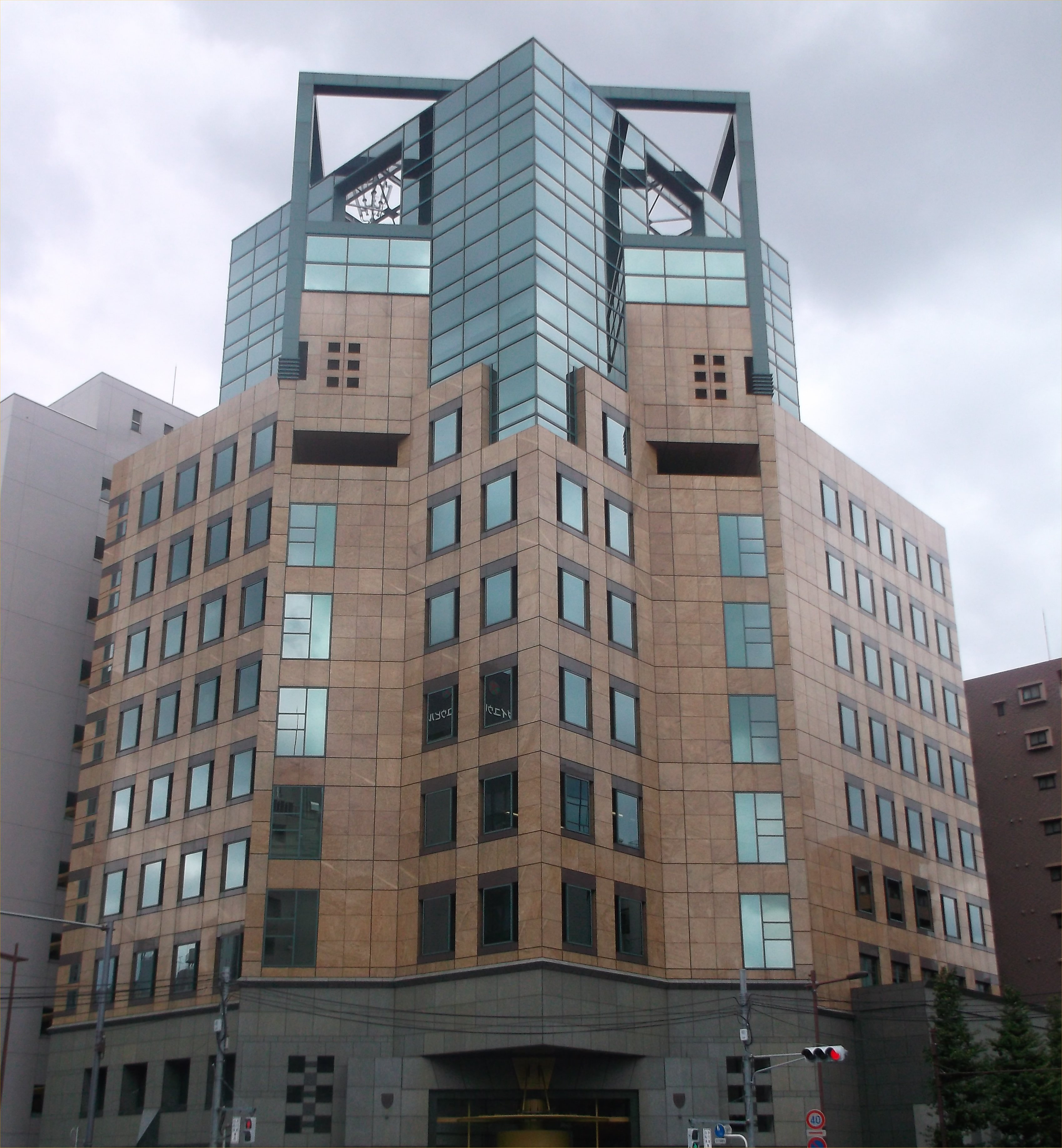
Ryukakusan head office

Higashi-Kanda (東神田) is a district of Chiyoda, Tokyo, Japan, consisting of 1- to 3-chōme. As of April 1, 2007, its population is 1,718.

Higashi-Kanda is located on the northeastern part of Chiyoda. It borders Asakusabashi 4-chōme, Taitō to the north; Asakusabashi 1-chōme, Taitō and Nihonbashi-Bakurochō, Chūō to the east; Nihonbashi-Kodenmachō, Chūō to the south; and Iwamotochō, Chiyoda to the west.

The Kanda River runs between Higashi-Kanda 2-chōme and 3-chōme.

Higashi-Kanda 1-chōme is home to the Tokyo Metropolitan Institute Hitotsubashi High School.

== Education ==
Chiyoda Board of Education operates public elementary and junior high schools. Izumi Elementary School (和泉小学校) is the zoned elementary school for Higashi-Kanda 1-3 chōme. There is a freedom of choice system for junior high schools in Chiyoda Ward, and so there are no specific junior high school zones.
