= Asakusabashi =

Town located in Taitō-ku, Tokyo

Coordinates: 35°41′45″N 139°47′08″E

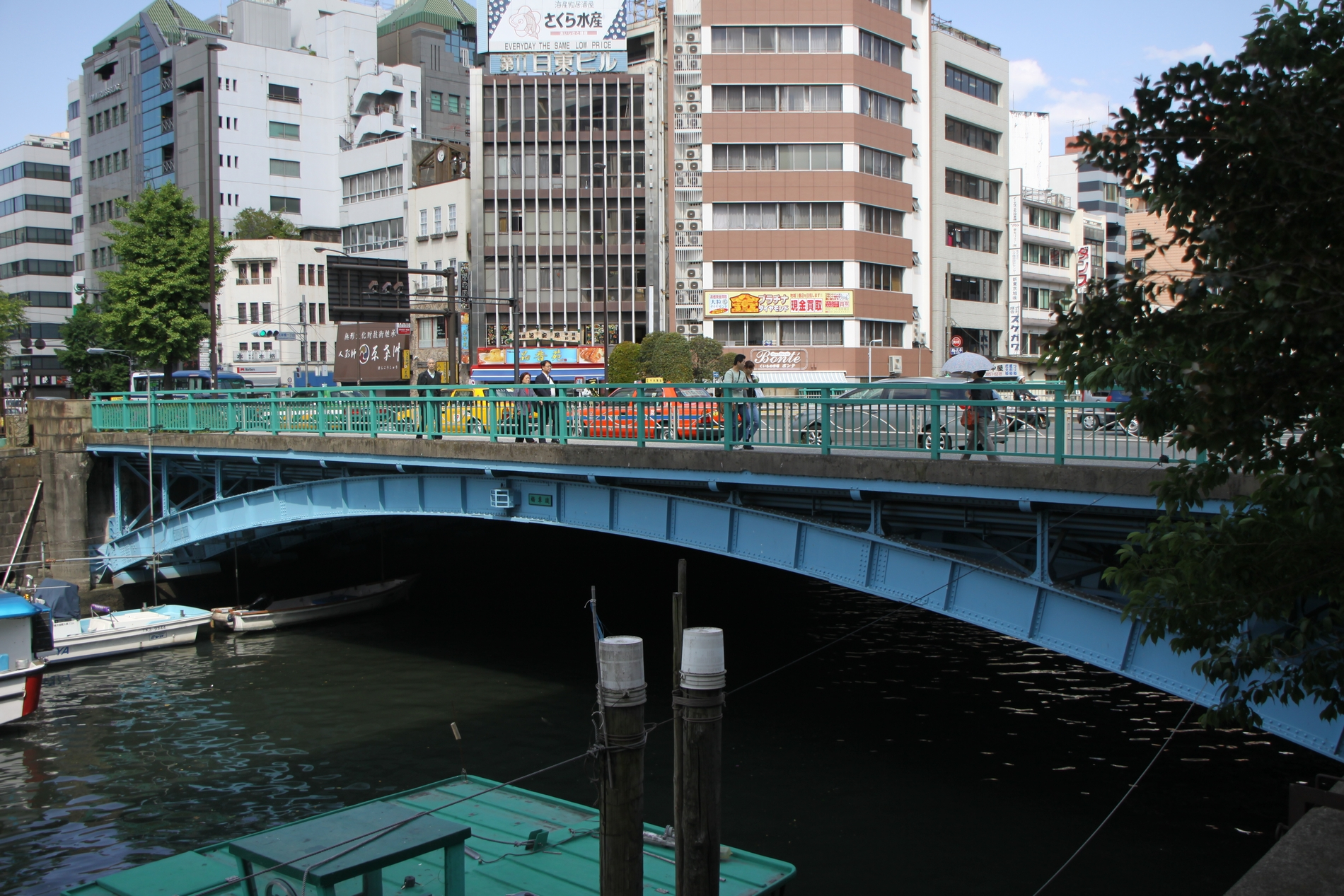
Asakusa Bridge

Asakusabashi (浅草橋) is a district of Taitō, Tokyo. It is historically known for many wholesale stores, and recently known for its large stores selling traditional Japanese dolls (although some of the largest doll stores, such as Kyugetsu and Shugetsu, are located across Edo-dori avenue, thus belonging to the Yanagibashi neighborhood).

== Transportation ==
Asakusabashi Station on the Chūō-Sōbu Line, as well as the station of the same name on the Asakusa Line, are both in Asakusabashi.

== Education ==
Taito City Board of Education operates public elementary and junior high schools.

All of Asakusabashi (1-5 chome) is zoned to Taitō Ikuei Elementary School (台東育英小学校), and Asakusa Junior High School (浅草中学校).

The Ryuhoku campus of the Lycée Franco-Japonais de Tokyo (Franco-Japanese High School of Tokyo) was in this neighborhood, until 2011.
