= Valenbisi =

Bicycle-sharing system in Valencia, Spain

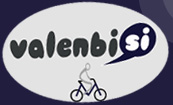

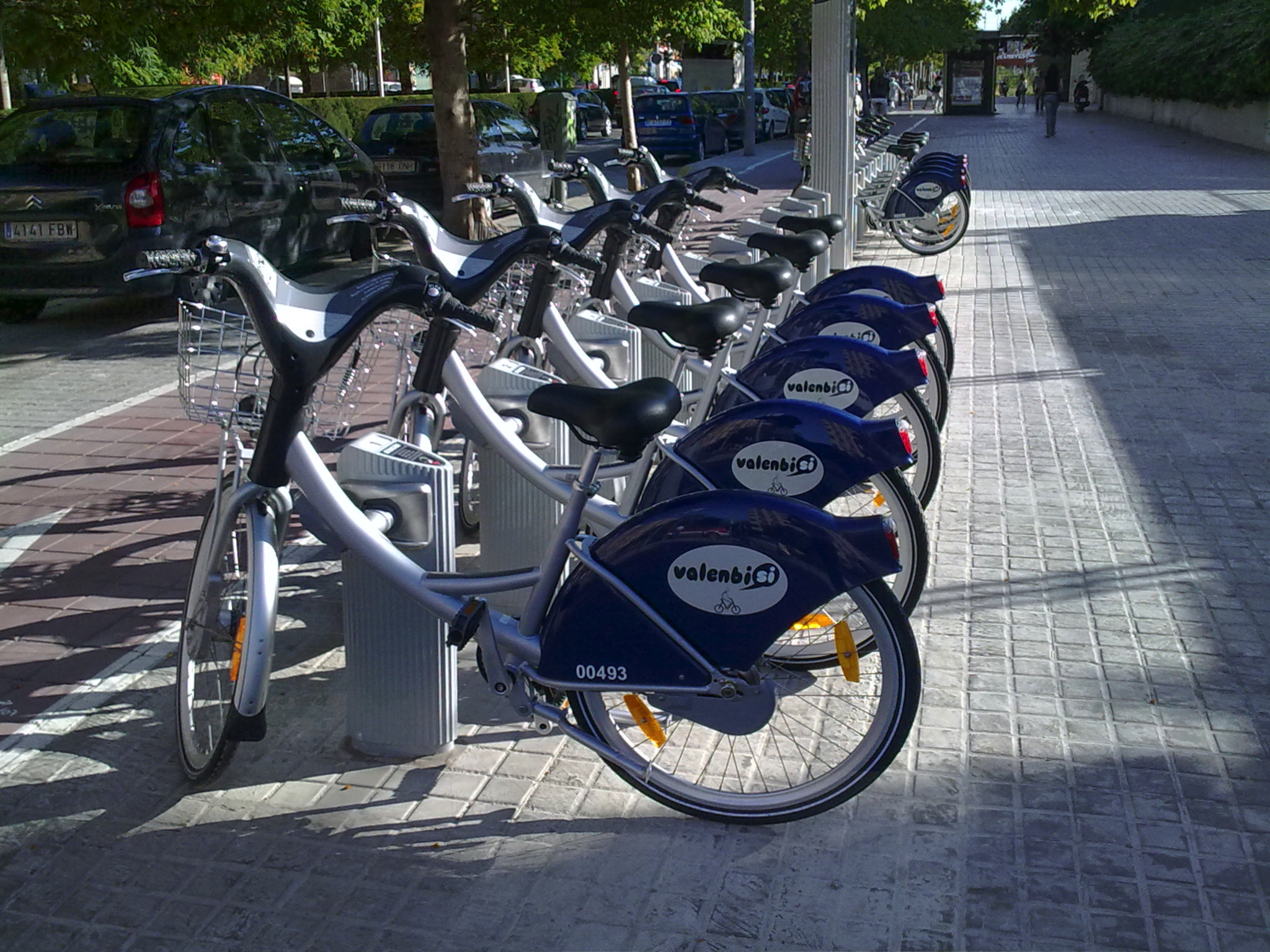
- Valenbisi station and bikes in Valencia.

Overview
- Owner: Ajuntament de València (municipality)
- Locale: Valencia
- Transit type: Bicycle sharing system
- Number of stations: 275 (2014)
- Daily ridership: 13,305 (2014)
- Annual ridership: 6,081,733 (until October 2014)
- Headquarters: Astúries Street, 34 (Sapiris Gallery); Customer service office
- Website: www.valenbisi.es

Operation
- Began operation: June 21, 2010
- Operator: JCDecaux
- Number of vehicles: 2.750

Valenbisi is the name of a bicycle sharing system in Valencia inaugurated on June 21, 2010. It is similar to the Vélo'v service in Lyon or Vélib' in Paris, and using the same bicycles and stations as used in Dublin, Vienna, and Brussels. Its purpose is to cover the small and medium daily routes within the city in a climate-friendly way, eliminating the pollution, roadway noise, and traffic congestion that motor vehicles create.

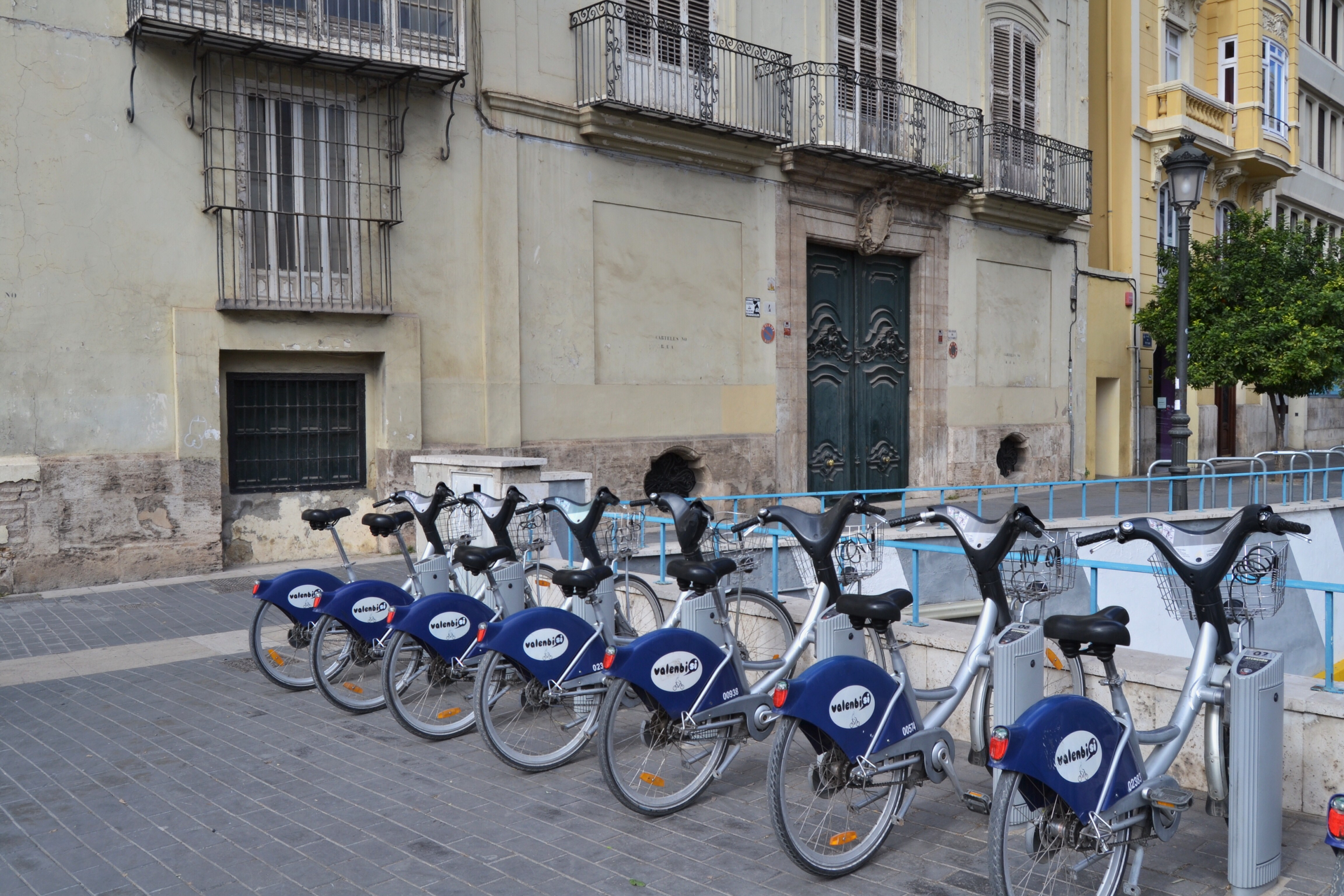
A Valenbisi station

== Operation ==
The city council and JCDecaux manage and maintain the system. To use it, users must acquire a weekly or yearly membership. Currently the network consists of more than 275 stations to lend and return over 2750 bicycles distributed throughout the system. The stations are situated through most of the flat areas of the city with a distance of around 300 to 400 metres between each one, with many situated next to public transport stops to allow for intermodal use. Metro Stations usually have signs pointing to the locations of nearest Valenbisi stations. The bikes can be lent from, and returned to, any station in the system, making it suitable for one-way travel. Each station has between 15 and 30 parking slots to fix and lock bicycles, but in highly transited areas many stations may be close together.

== Subscription ==
Use of the system is based on membership, with one-week passes aimed at visitors, and annual passes aimed at residents. Users can subscribe online or by visiting a service office.

== Stations ==
There are more than 270 Valenbisi stations in Valencia. Bike stations have generally replaced on-street car or motorcycle parking spaces, though others were placed on large pedestrian areas. Each station includes a long series of docks for bikes, with a computerized pylon at one end for completing transactions. There are two different types of stations. With and without card readers. The stations are available in Spanish, English and French

== Financing ==
The system operator generstes revenue in various ways. As part of the contract, the operator is given rights to 600 advertising stations across the city, which generates over €1.5 million in revenue annually. Additionally, the operator receives subsidies from the local government as well as revenues from yearly user fees (€29.12) and daily fees (€3.99).

== See also ==
- Outline of cycling
- Utility cycling - Short-term hire schemes
