= JCDecaux =

French outdoor advertising company

JCDecaux Group
- Type: Public (Societas Europaea)
- Traded as: Euronext Paris: DEC; CAC Mid 60 Component
- ISIN: FR0000077919
- Industry: Outdoor advertising
- Founded: 1964; 62 years ago
- Founder: Jean-Claude Decaux
- Headquarters: Neuilly-sur-Seine, France
- Area served: Worldwide
- Revenue: ▲€3.57 billion (2023)
- Net income: ▲€209.2 million (2023)
- Owners: JCDecaux Holding, fully owned by the Decaux family (69.83%); Public (28.70%)
- Number of employees: 13,030 (2016)
- Parent: JCDecaux Holding
- Subsidiaries: Cyclocity - Decaux Publicité Extérieure (DPE) - JCDecaux Mobilier Urbain - Semup - Sopact (100%); MCDecaux (85%); Somupi (66%); JCDecaux Avenir - JCDecaux Airport - JCDecaux Artvertising (60%)
- Website: jcdecaux.com

JCDecaux SE (French pronunciation: [ʒi se dəko], /dəˈkoʊ/) is a French multinational corporation specialised in outdoor advertising. As of 2016, it is the largest company in its sector worldwide with adverts on 140,000 bus stops and 145 airports. The company is headquartered in Neuilly-sur-Seine, Île-de-France, France.

The company was founded in 1964 in Lyon by Jean-Claude Decaux who led the company until 2000. The company is still majority-owned by the Decaux family, with most of the remaining stock listed on Euronext Paris. The founder's sons, Jean-François Decaux and Jean-Charles Decaux, alternate annually as the chief executive officers.

== History ==
Jean-Claude Decaux (1937–2016) first created a company in 1955 that specialised in outdoor advertising alongside motorways. However, as these billboards were heavily taxed by law, Jean-Claude Decaux turned towards a business model in 1964 that was based on city billboards and invented the concept of advertising street furniture – well-maintained bus shelters fully funded by advertisers.

In 1999, the group acquired Havas Media Communication and Avenir. This acquisition allowed the group to expand into the large-format advertising market and advertising in airports. In 2001, JCDecaux entered the Euronext Stock Exchange with an opening share price of €16.50. In 2002, Jean-Claude Decaux passed the management of the company on to two of his three sons, Jean-Charles Decaux and Jean-François Decaux, who then became co-CEOs of the company.

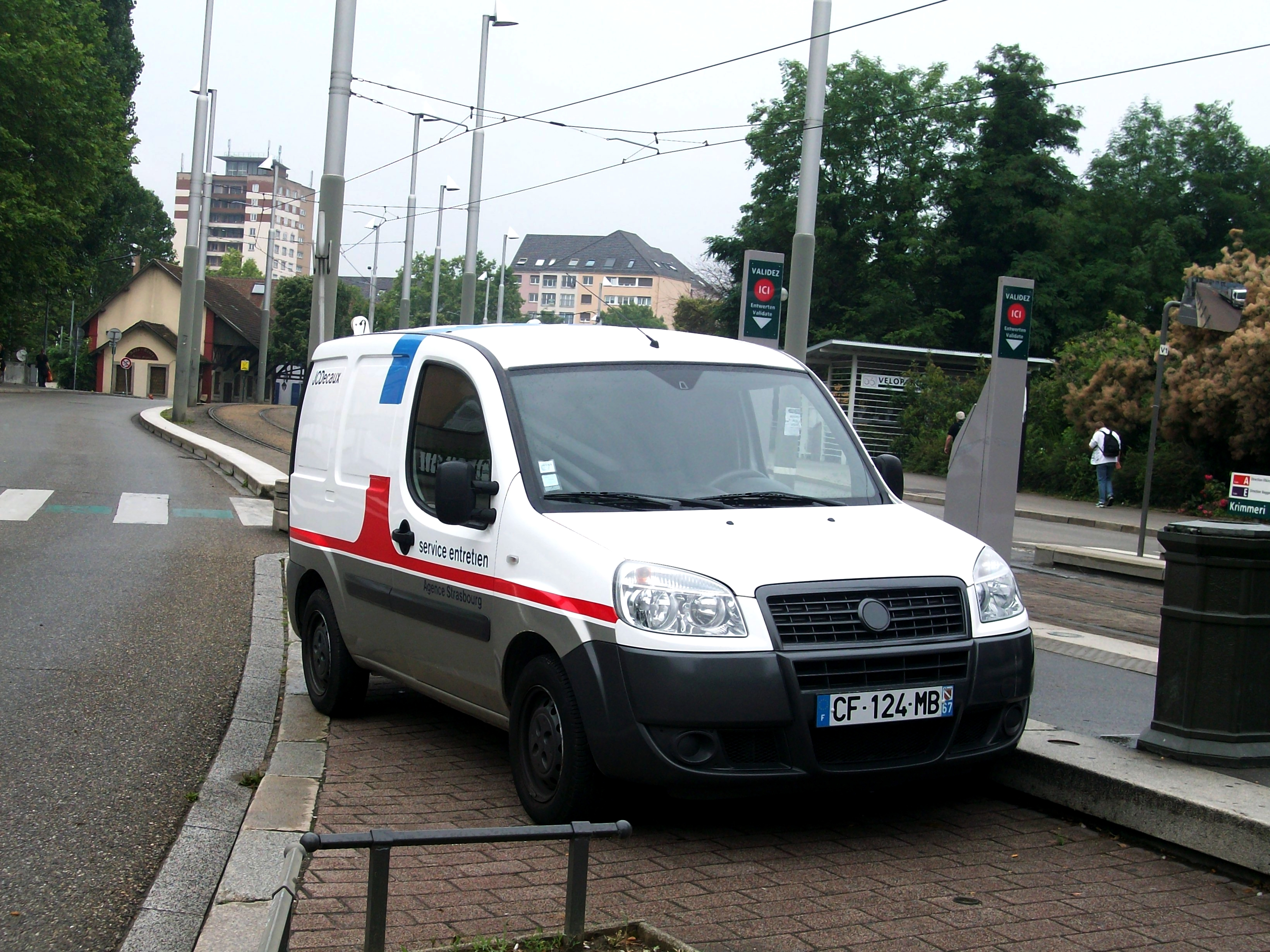
JCDecaux van in France

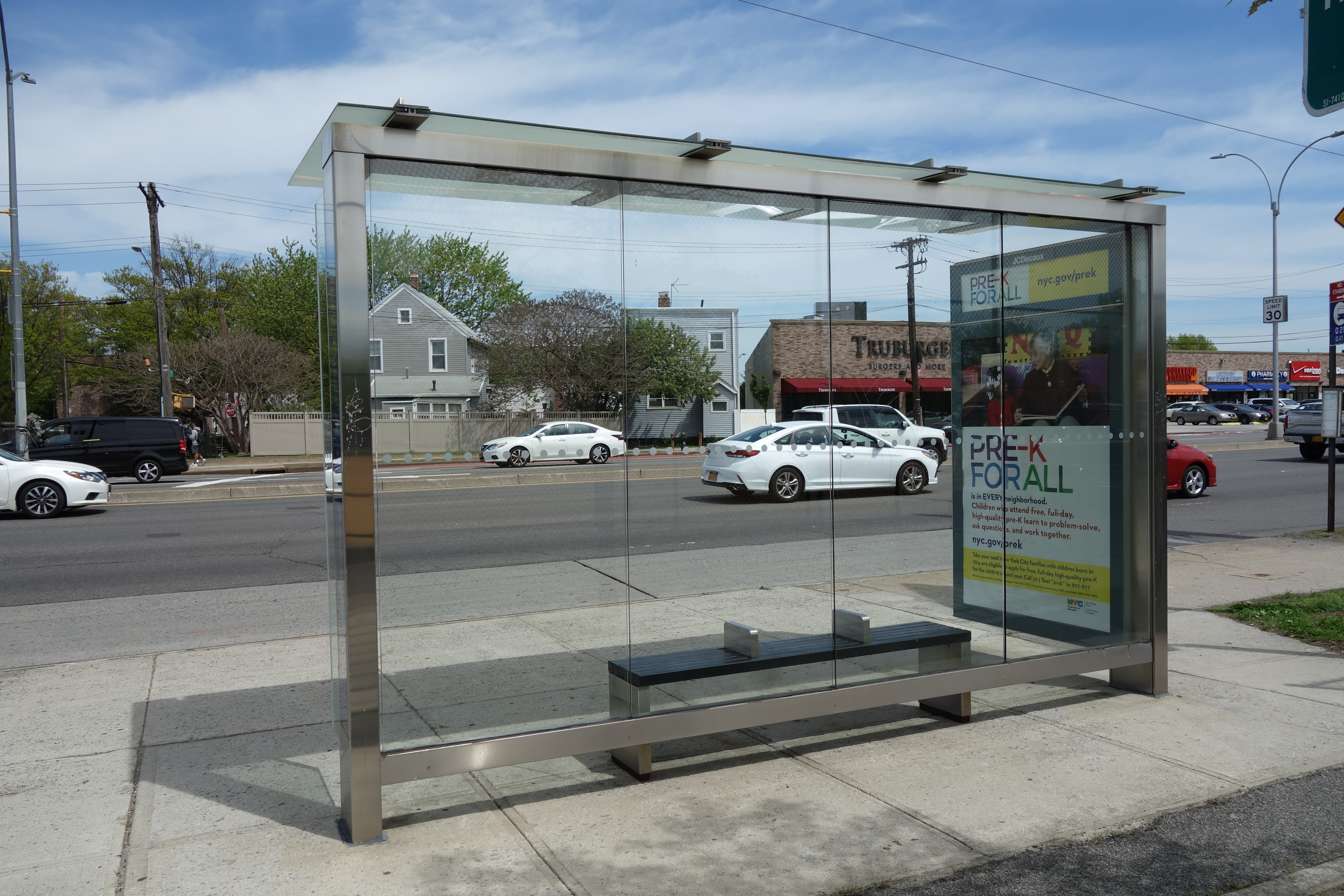
JCDecaux bus shelter in Queens, New York, United States

In 2011, JCDecaux acquired French kiosk business MediaKiosk.

In January 2022, JCDecaux reported its 2021 revenue as $3.06 billion, an increase of 18.7%, which was perceived as an indication that the out-of-home market had recovered from the disruption caused by the COVID-19 pandemic restrictions of the previous years.

=== Controversies ===
==== Helsinki Finns Party campaign ====
During the 2021 Finnish municipal elections, a campaign in Helsinki public transport run by JCDecaux on the behalf of the Finns Party was accused of racism and spreading inflammatory messages by suggesting that immigrants are preferred to the native Finns in the allocation of municipally owned rental housing in Helsinki. Consequently, JCDecaux and Helsinki City Transport have decided to cancel the campaign. This in turn was criticized by the Finns Party, including by its chairman Jussi Halla-aho, however, the party's request for a formal police investigation was denied.

==== Pro-Russian ads in Norway ====
During the early campaign before the 2025 Norwegian parliamentary election, the company was criticized for running an advertisement campaign on the Oslo Metro echoing Russian disinformation techniques and opposing Norwegian military aid to Ukraine following the Russian invasion. The campaign was ostensibly funded by a newly established pro-Russian party Peace and Justice (FOR). However, the party neither reported donations anywhere near the required amount nor disclosed its funding sources, leading to strong suspicions of foreign interference and possible Russian financing. As a result, the Political Parties Act Committee launched an investigation into the campaign. JCDecaux's Norway head, Gisle Holst Roness, declined to disclose how much the company was paid. The campaign also drew sharp criticism from Oslo Sporveiers Arbeiderforening (OSA), the city's largest transport union, which denounced the ads as “populist, divisive and irresponsible,” stating that such messages “pollute the urban environment” and “undermine fundamental values such as international solidarity and the fight for peace and democracy.” The campaign was aborted after the party has accused the operator Sporveien, and consequently JCDecaux, of breach of contract due to the widespread vandalism aimed at the anti-Ukraine posters.

== Bicycle rentals ==
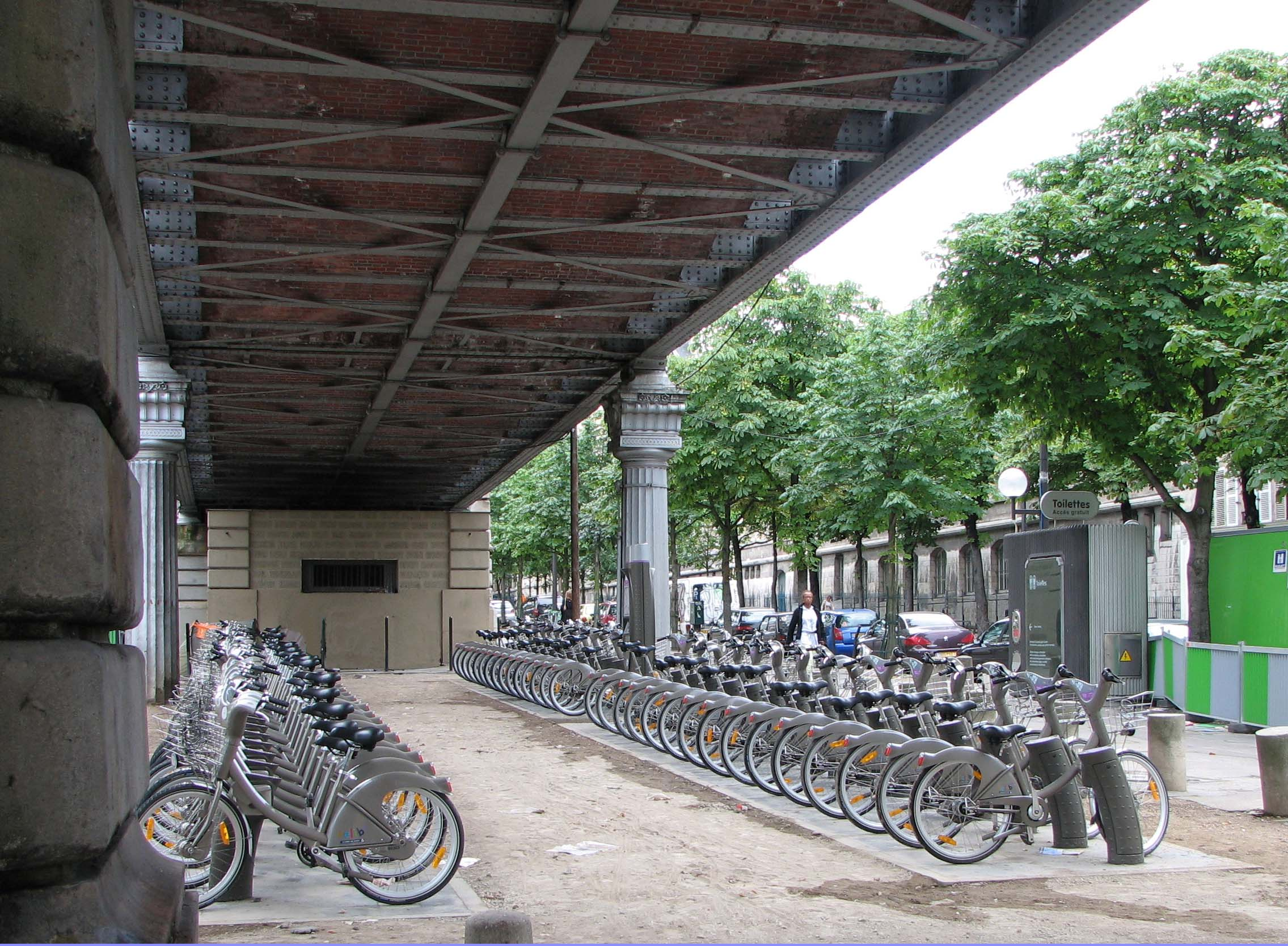
Vélib' (station at Sèvres–Lecourbe pictured) was operated by JCDecaux until 2017.

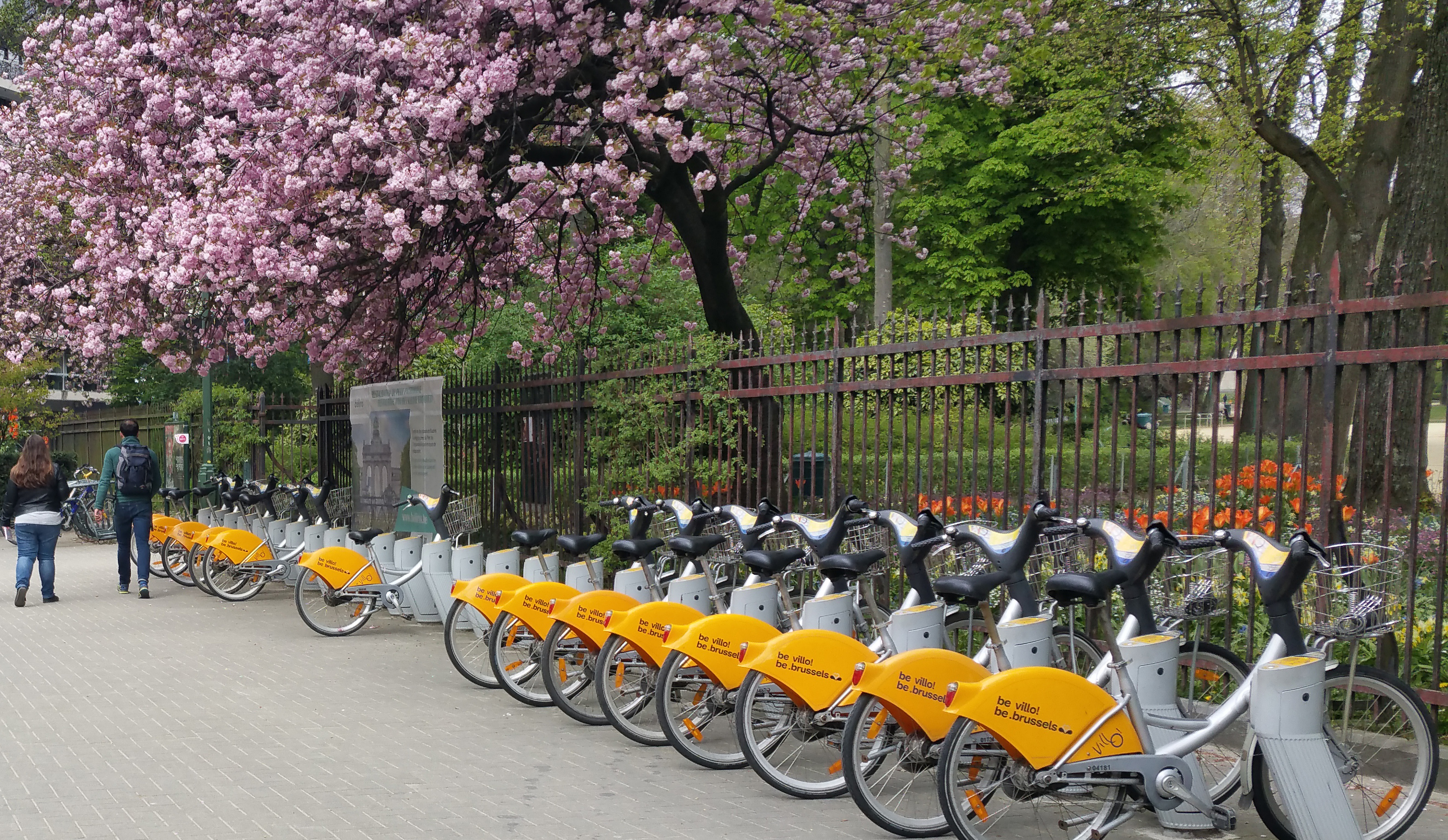
Villo! bikes in Brussels

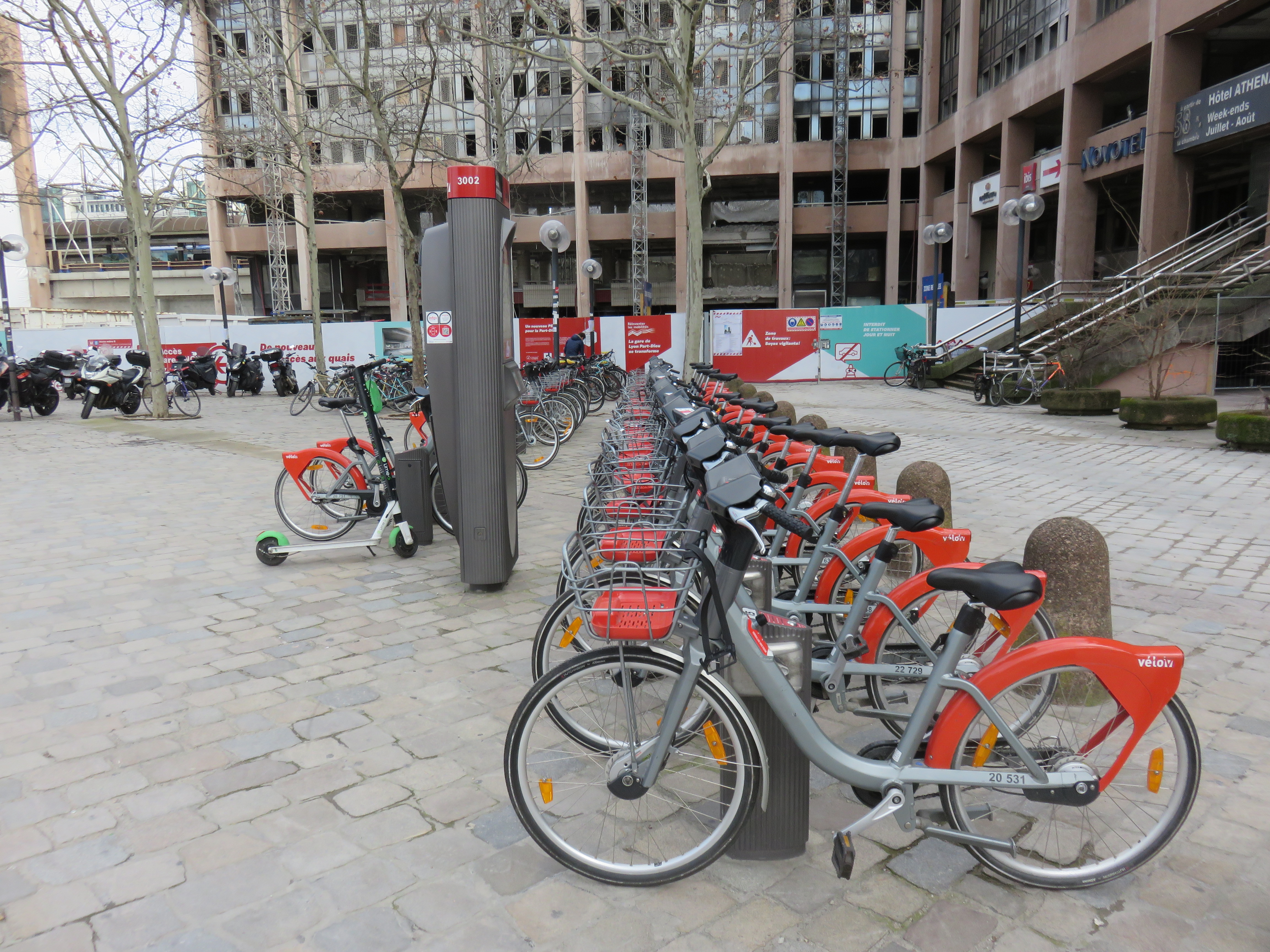
Vélo'v bikes near Lyon-Part-Dieu station

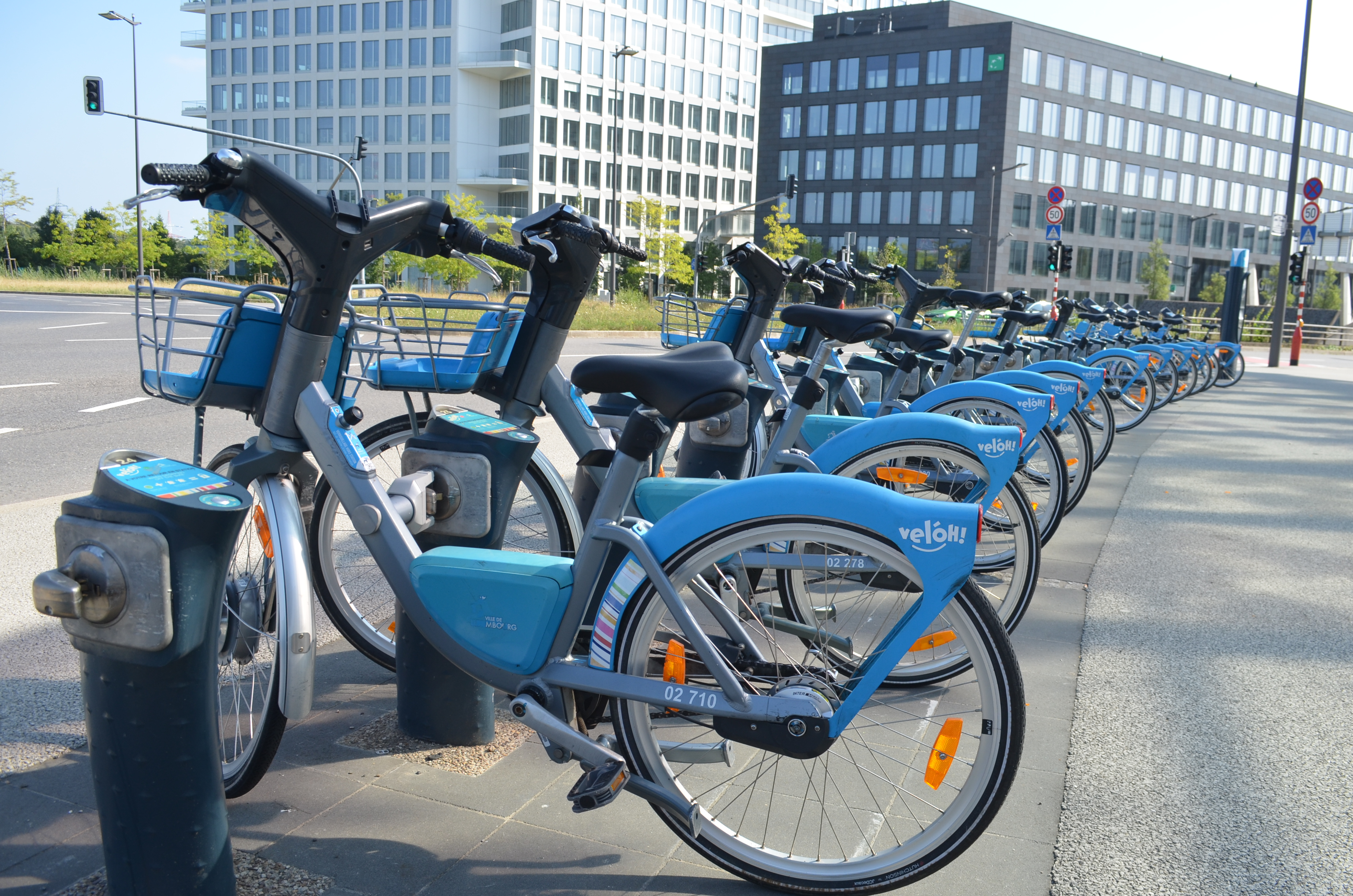
Vel'OH! bike station in Luxembourg City

JCDecaux operates fleets of city bicycles under the brand Cyclocity.

The cities that have implemented JCDecaux's bicycle rental systems are listed below.

To sort this table by any column, click on the icon next to the column title.

City	Country	Years of operation	System name	Stations	Bikes
Amiens	France	since 2008	Vélam	26	313
Besançon	France	since 2007	VéloCité	30	200
Brisbane	Australia	since 2010	CityCycle	150	2000
Brussels	Belgium	since 2009	Villo!	360	5000
Cergy-Pontoise	France	since 2009	VélO2	42	400
Córdoba	Spain	since 2003	Cyclocity	4	35
Créteil	France	since 2010	Cristolib’	10	130
Dublin	Ireland	since 2009	Dublinbikes	102	1500
Gijón	Spain	since 2003	Gijon-Bici	8	64
Gothenburg	Sweden	since 2010	Styr & Ställ	50	600
Kazan	Russia	2013-2020	Veli’K	6	120
Lillestrøm	Norway	since 2013	Bysykkel	5	50
Ljubljana	Slovenia	since 2011	BicikeLJ	84	840
Lund	Sweden	since 2014	Lundahoj	17	250
Luxembourg City	Luxembourg	since 2008	Vel'oh!	144	1157
Lyon	France	since 2005	Vélo'v	348	4000
Maribor	Slovenia	since 2022	Mbajk	22	220
Marseille	France	since 2007	Le vélo	130	1000
Mulhouse	France	since 2007	Vélocité	40	240
Namur	Belgium	since 2010	Li Bia Velo	24	240
Nancy	France	since 2008	VélOstan'lib	29	250
Nantes	France	since 2008	Bicloo	102	880
Paris	France	2007-2017 (Note: Transferred to Smovengo in 2018)	Vélib'	1263	9000
Rouen	France	since 2007	Cy'clic	20	250
Santander	Spain	since 2008	Tusbic	15	200
Seville	Spain	since 2007	Sevici	260	2500
Toulouse	France	since 2007	VélôToulouse	253	2400
Toyama	Japan	since 2010	Cyclocity-Toyama	15	150
Valencia	Spain	since 2010	Valenbisi	275	2750
Vienna	Austria	2003-2022	City Bike	116	1500
Vilnius	Lithuania	since 2013	Cyclocity Vilnius	37	300

== Worldwide presence ==
JCDecaux operates in more than 75 countries across five continents. 77.9% of JCDecaux's annual revenue comes from outside of France.

=== Europe ===
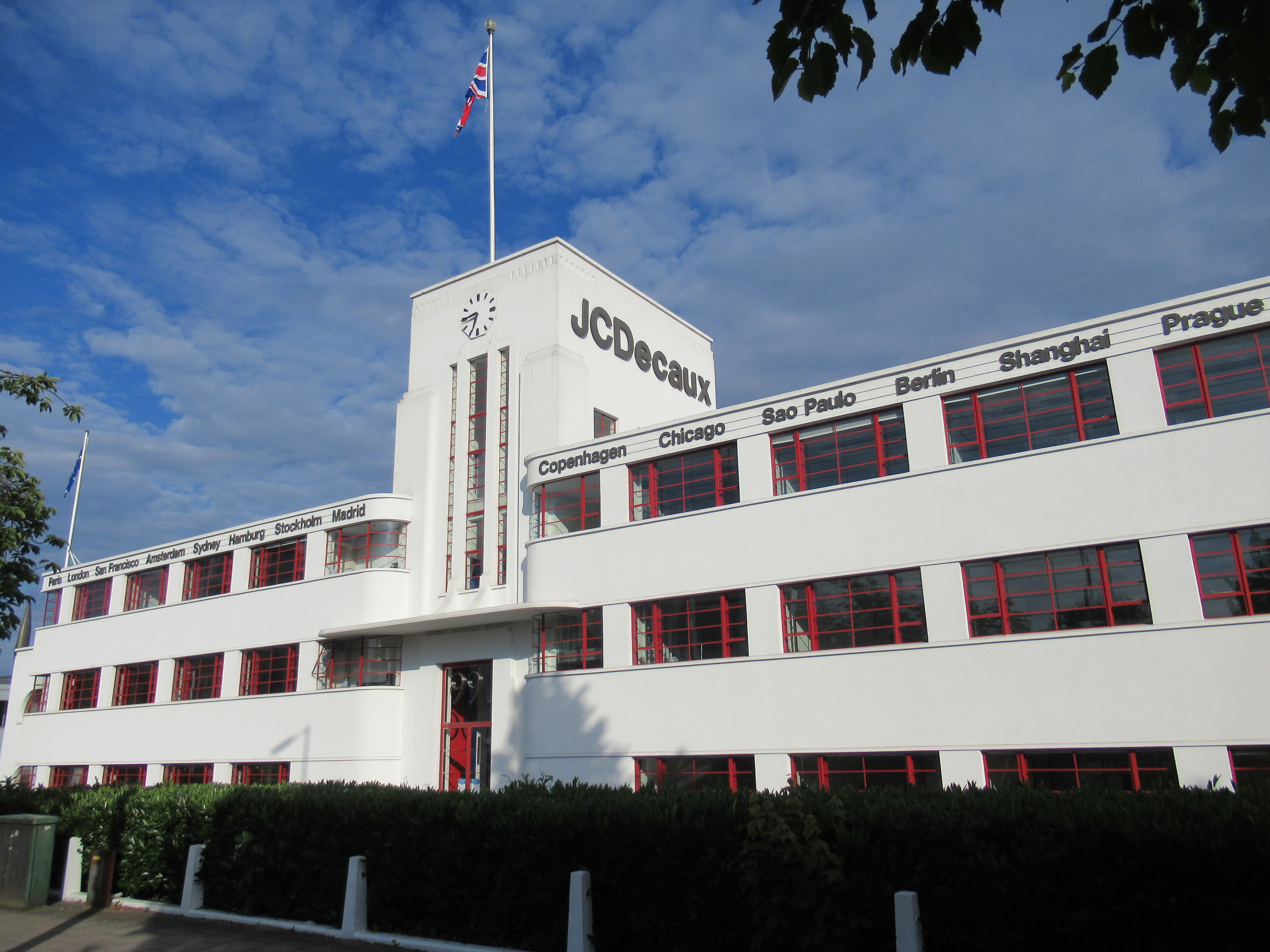
UK office, former Currys on the Golden Mile in West London

JCDecaux originated in France.

Thanks to its partnership with Wall AG, the company settled in Germany in 1982 and then in Turkey in 1996.

JCDecaux UK was founded in the United Kingdom in 1984 and is the market leader in outdoor advertising. In 2005, JCDecaux UK unveiled the UK's tallest outdoor advertising structure: the M4 Torch. JCDecaux won several important contracts such as: a contract for Outdoor Advertising at St Pancras International in London (2011), and National Rail Outdoor Advertising and BAA Advertising Contracts at Heathrow, Heathrow Express, Aberdeen, Edinburgh, and Glasgow Airports. In 2010, JCDecaux completed the acquisition of UK rival Titan Outdoor. In 2015, JCDecaux won the Transport for London (TfL) bus shelter advertising contract.

JCDecaux can now be found in most European countries, including Luxembourg (1985), the Netherlands (1986), Finland (1989), Sweden (1989), Spain (1990), Slovakia (1990), Czech Republic (1995), Norway (1998), Ireland (1999), Poland (1999) and in Hungary (2012). JCDecaux can also be found in the Baltic states (2002), Bulgaria (2007), and Ukraine (2007). Additionally, JCDecaux is present in Denmark (AFA JCDecaux Denmark) since 1989, in Italy (IGPDecaux) since 1995, in Iceland (AFA JCDecaux Iceland) since 1998, in Switzerland (APG|SGA) since 1999, in Austria (Gewista) since 2001, in Croatia and Slovenia (Europlakat) since 2001, in Serbia (Alma Quattro) since 2003 and in Russia (Russ Outdoor) since 2007 through equity or joint ventures.

=== North America ===
JCDecaux has been present in the United States since 1993 in major cities and 26 US airports, including New York, Washington, D.C., and Los Angeles. JCDecaux entered Canada in 2002.

Its North America division has its head office 350 Fifth Avenue in Midtown Manhattan, New York City.

=== South America ===
JCDecaux moved into Brazil and Argentina in 1998. The company is also a part of the outdoor market in Argentina, Uruguay (2000), Chile (2001) and Perú (2014). JCDecaux won a contract for 1000 digital clocks in São Paulo (2012), completing the acquisition of 85% of EUMEX.

=== Middle East and Africa ===
The company's operation also covers the Middle East with offices established in Dubai and Abu Dhabi in the United Arab Emirates, Doha in Qatar, Tel Aviv in Israel, as well as Riyadh, Jeddah, Dammam and Madinah in Saudi Arabia. JCDecaux signed a 20-year exclusive street furniture contract to provide the City of Muscat, the capital of the Sultanate of Oman, with a wide range of advertising street furniture.

JCDecaux is present in the following African countries: Cameroon, Côte d'Ivoire, Gabon, Nigeria, Malawi, Mauritius, Réunion, Tanzania, Angola, Botswana, Eswatini, Lesotho, Mozambique, Namibia, Zambia, and Zimbabwe.

=== Asia and Oceania ===
JCDecaux expanded to Australia in 1997. In Asia, JCDecaux can be found in Singapore and Thailand (1999), Japan (2000, as MCDecaux) and South Korea (2001). JCDecaux entered China in 2004, in seven airports, including Hong Kong, Shanghai and Beijing. The company also has a presence in India (2006), Uzbekistan (2006), Kazakhstan (2007) and Mongolia (2014).

In 2018, the company acquired the Australian company APN Outdoor.

According to JCDecaux, they have been maintaining and building about 1200 bus shelters within the NDMC since 2006 on their behalf. In March 2020, JCDecaux reported that they had been disinfecting bus shelters in Delhi in order to combat the spread of COVID-19 effectively.

== See also ==
- MCDecaux – Joint venture between JCDecaux and Mitsubishi Corporation.

And rival outdoor advertising companies:

- Pattison Outdoor Advertising (Canada)
- Criticism of advertising
- Ad creep
