= B2B Games =

French video game developer

- Type: Video game developer
- Industry: Video games
- Founded: 2005; 21 years ago
- Headquarters: Lyon, Rhône-Alpes, France
- Website: www.b2b-games.com

B2B Games is a content provider and business developer and also a serious game developer, currently based in Lyon, France. The firm was created in 2005 by Yves Santelli, former export manager of Infogrames and export director of Anuman Interactive. Since its inception, the company is working in 3 main areas: Serious Gaming, Marketing Games and game publishing.

The B2B Games website is currently defunct.

== Serious gaming ==
- In May 2009, B2B Games has developed with Persistent studio "3D Network", based on their HellHeaven 3D engine. This serious game was designed to train, inform, and prevent the risks of public works around near buried networks. The Federation of the Public Works in Rhône-Alpes is the first Federation in France to use a Serious Game, to train, and inform about the risks inherent to these professions. This game will be used inside companies, in training centers public works (vocational training centres, professional secondary schools) and will present on giant screens and PC, during professional or consumer events, by the federation and its members.
- On December 7, 2006, B2B Games has released "Velo'v Racing" for the City of Lyon. The game was created by B2B-Games and Coyote Software to promote the Fête des lumières. Using a virtual Vélo'v, emblematic means of transport in Lyon, the visitors become players and are invited to gain typical candels, going through all the main places highlighted during the festival. The serious game was displayed on giant screen in the "place de la république".

== Marketing games ==
- B2B Games has created several B2B operations worldwide for trade animations and promotions with big announcers such as McDonald's, Coca-Cola, Ferrero, Nestlé, etc. including customization with in-game advertising.
