= MOBIB =

Public transit payment system in Belgium

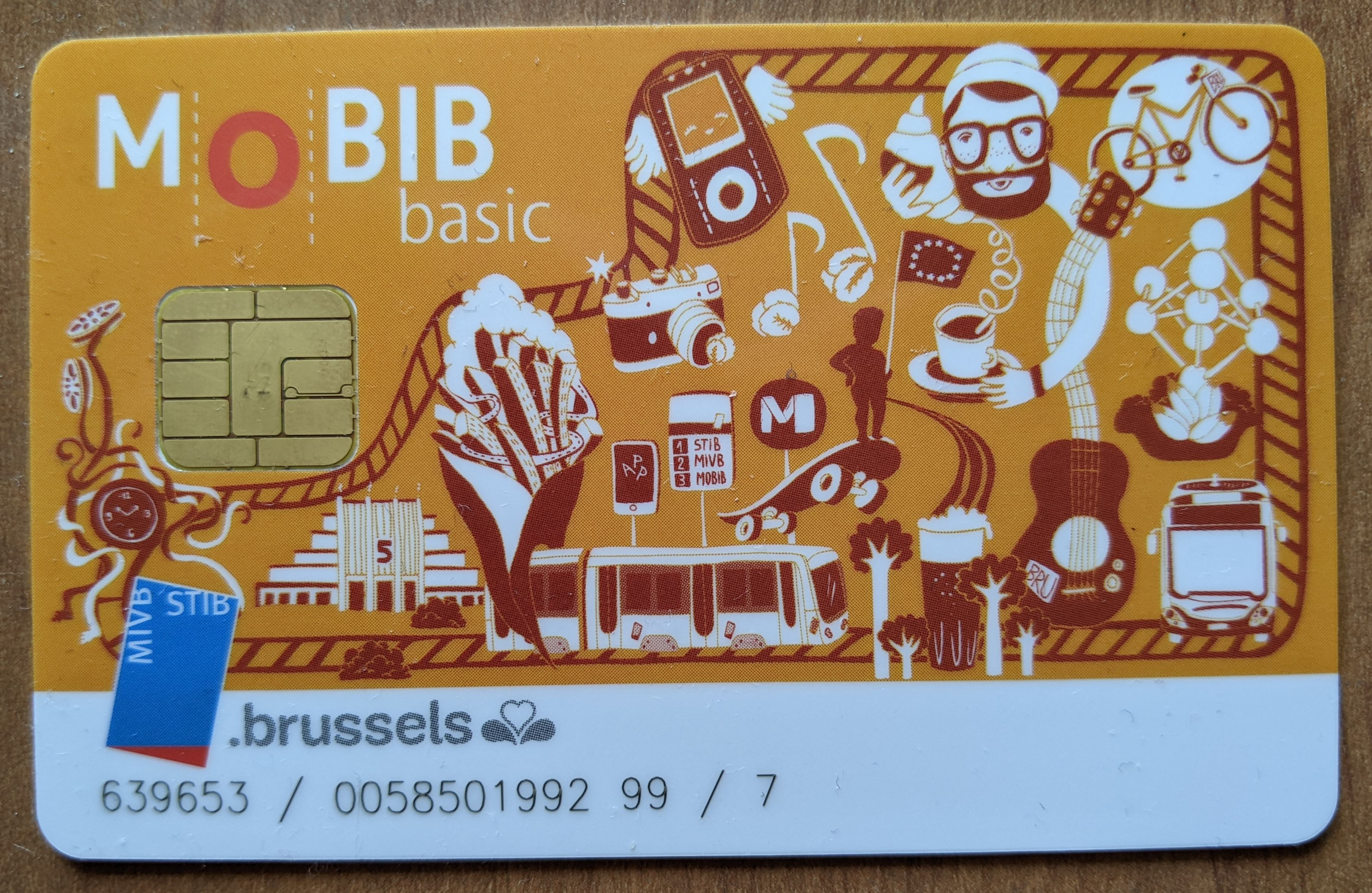
- MOBIB Basic card issued by STIB/MIVB
- Location: Belgium
- Launched: 2008
- Technology: Calypso
- Operator: STIB/MIVB; NMBS/SNCB; De Lijn; TEC
- Currency: Euro
- Website: https://www.mobib.be

MOBIB, also written as MoBIB, is a contactless smart card used as an integrated ticketing system for travel products of most public transport in Belgium. First introduced by the Brussels Intercommunal Transport Company (STIB/MIVB) in 2008, it has since has expanded to include the National Railway Company of Belgium (NMBS/SNCB), as well as the public transport operators De Lijn and TEC. Each operator issues a MOBIB card with a unique design, but it can be used with all four operators. Transport tickets are usually specific to each operator, though some subscriptions, such as 'Brupass' and 'Brupass XL', are valid across multiple operators. Passengers may order a card online from one of the four operators or in-person at a customer service office, often located at major train stations.

The card contains a near-field communication (NFC) tag and is compatible with the ISO 7816 contact interface. It can store up to eight tickets, including single trips, multi-trip passes, and subscriptions. Additionally, bicycle-sharing (like Villo! and Blue-Bike), car-sharing (such as Cambio), and station parking subscriptions can also be loaded onto the card.

Unlike the Dutch OV-chipkaart, the MOBIB card is not a stored-value card and therefore does not support loading a monetary balance. For all journeys, a pre-purchased ticket, specific to the trip, must be loaded onto the card.

The card can be held a few centimeters away from the reader and uses the Calypso standard, similar to the French Navigo card. With an NFC-enabled smartphone and the MOBIB app, users can check the card's contents. This can also be done via the info button on validation devices, at ticket machines, or at service counters.
