= MCDecaux =

Japanese advertising company

- Headquarters: Nishikichō, Chiyoda, Tokyo, Japan
- Website: mcdecaux.co.jp

MCDecaux, Inc. (エムシードゥコー株式会社 Emushīdukō Kabushiki Kaisha) is a Japanese advertising firm headquartered in the Nishimoto Kosan Nishikicho Building (西本興産錦町ビル Nishimoto Kōsan Nishikichō Biru) in Nishikichō, Chiyoda, Tokyo.

MCDecaux is a joint venture with JCDecaux and Mitsubishi Corporation. JCDecaux owns 85% of the company, with the remaining 15% owned by Mitsubishi. In 2005, MCDecaux got a 15-year contract with Ito Yokado.
