= Jean-Claude Decaux =

French businessman

- Born: Jean-Claude Jacques Decaux; 15 September 1937; Beauvais, France
- Died: 27 May 2016 (aged 78); Neuilly-sur-Seine, France
- Occupations: Founder and CEO of JCDecaux
- Spouse: Danièle Piraud
- Children: 3

Jean-Claude Decaux (French pronunciation: [ʒɑ̃ klod dəko], /dəˈkoʊ/; 15 September 1937 – 27 May 2016) was a French billionaire businessman and the founder of advertising company JCDecaux. The company is now run by his sons, Jean-François Decaux and Jean-Charles Decaux.

== Personal life ==
Jean-Claude Decaux was the son of a shoe salesman in Beauvais, France.

He was married with three children and lived in Paris.

He died on 27 May 2016 aged 78.

== Career ==
At the age of 18, inspired by an argument with his father over the family shoe store's window display, Jean-Claude started a business creating billboards along French roadways. In 1963, legislation in France placed restrictions on billboard use which forced Decaux out of business. He founded JCDecaux in 1964. He made a deal with the city of Lyon, proposing that he would build bus shelters and keep them clean in exchange for advertising space there. The company quickly expanded to other cities.

In 1980, Decaux personally designed the Sanisette public toilet, a self-cleaning public toilet, as a replacement for the pissoirs of Paris.

In January 2015, according to Forbes, he had a net worth of $6.2 billion.

== See also ==
- List of French billionaires by net worth
- The World's Billionaires
