= Villo! =

Bicycle-sharing system in Brussels, Belgium

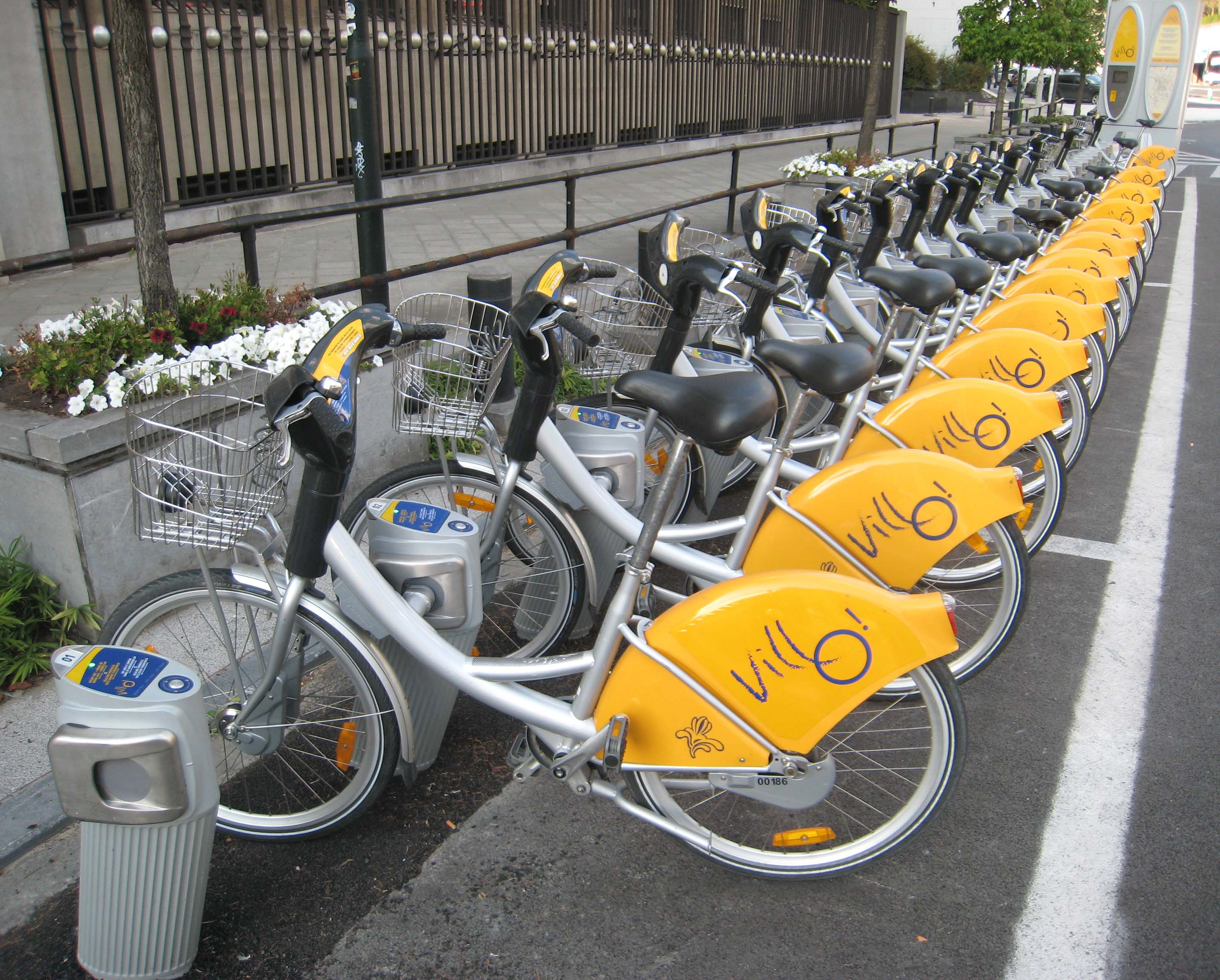
Line of bikes at a Villo! station

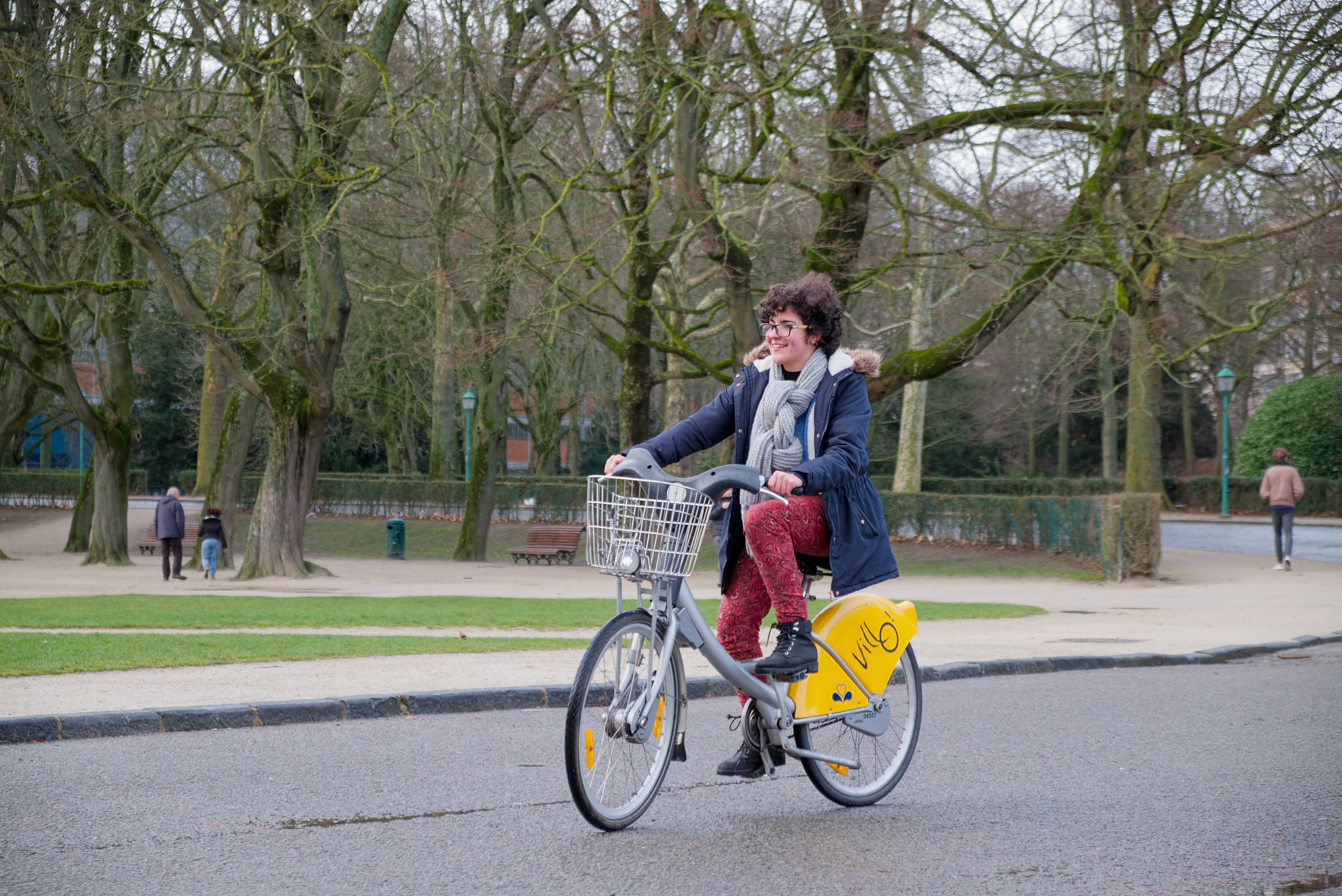
Villo! user in the Parc du Cinquantenaire/Jubelpark

Villo! (a portmanteau of the French words ville ("city") and vélo ("bicycle")) is a public bicycle rental programme in Brussels-Capital Region, Belgium. It was launched on 19 May 2009 in cooperation between the Brussels-Capital region and the company JCDecaux as a replacement of the former scheme Cyclocity, launched in 2006.

The scheme is currently in its second phase of expansion which will see a system of 5,000 bikes in all of the municipalities of the Brussels region by 2013, making it one of the biggest in the world.

== Overview ==
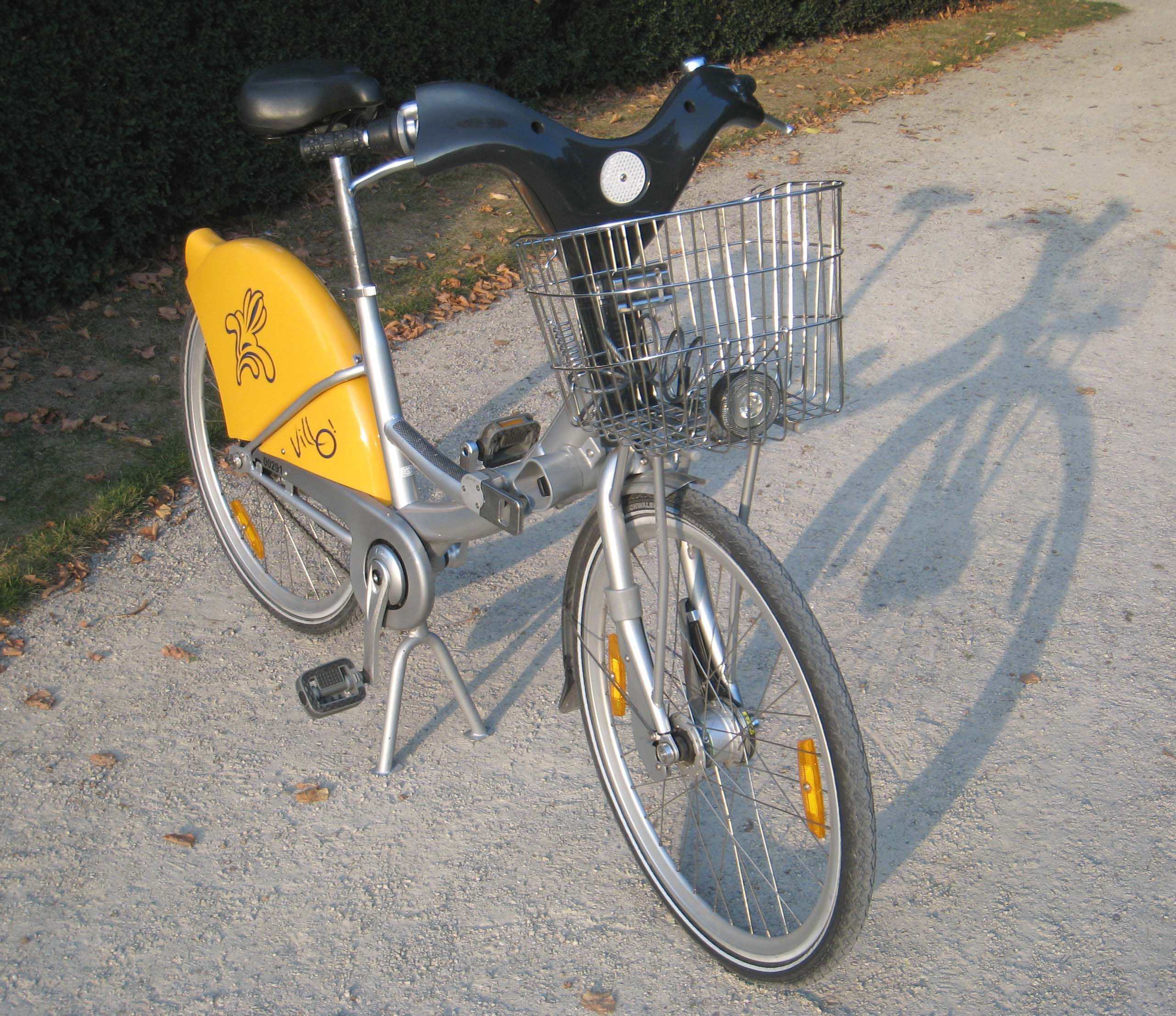
Villo! bicycle

The bicycles are equipped with adjustable-height saddle, 7-speed gear, front basket, covered chain drive, always-on front and rear lights, front and rear disc brakes, puncture-resistant Schwalbe Marathon tires and integrated bicycle lock; this all adds up to a weight of 22 kg.

Since May 2011, holders of a MoBIB card for STIB/MIVB, the Brussels mass transit authority, have been able to use their card to access the Villo! network. Use of Villo increases on days of public transit strikes, for example doubling on the day of the general strike, 30 January 2012.

As of December 2011, the system had 27,000 regular subscribers. On average, 25,000 bikes were used per week. Plans are under way for an expansion of the network in a second phase which will expand to all of the communities in the Brussels area by 2013. By the end of this phase, there should be 360 sites and 5,000 bikes available. Some popular stations will also be expanded to deal with demand.

According to the Brussels Region, 400 car parking places have been removed to make way for villo stations during the first phase of the project. Some residents have complained about the loss of permanent parking spots, but proponents of the programme argue that overall the programme should increase the amount of parking available due to a long-term reduction in motorised traffic.

== Cyclocity ==
The original cyclocity programme, also run by JCDecaux was launched on 17 September 2006 to coincide with Car Free Day that year. Originally there were 250 bikes available at 23 stations, exclusively in the City of Brussels proper. The programme was not a success, with most of the blame going to the limited scope of the network. It was relaunched under the Villo! brand in 2009 with an expanded network.

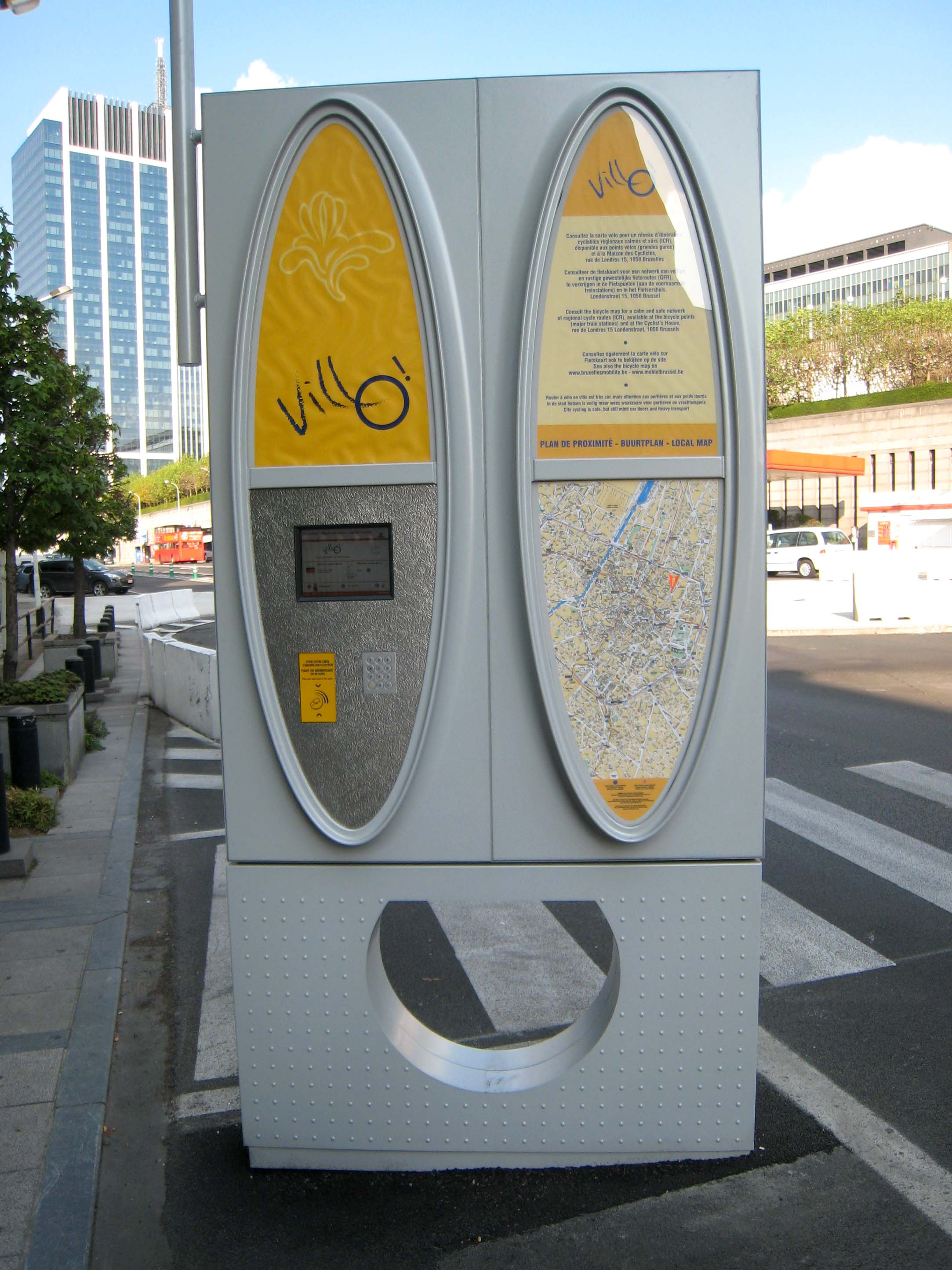
Terminal and map point at a Villo! station

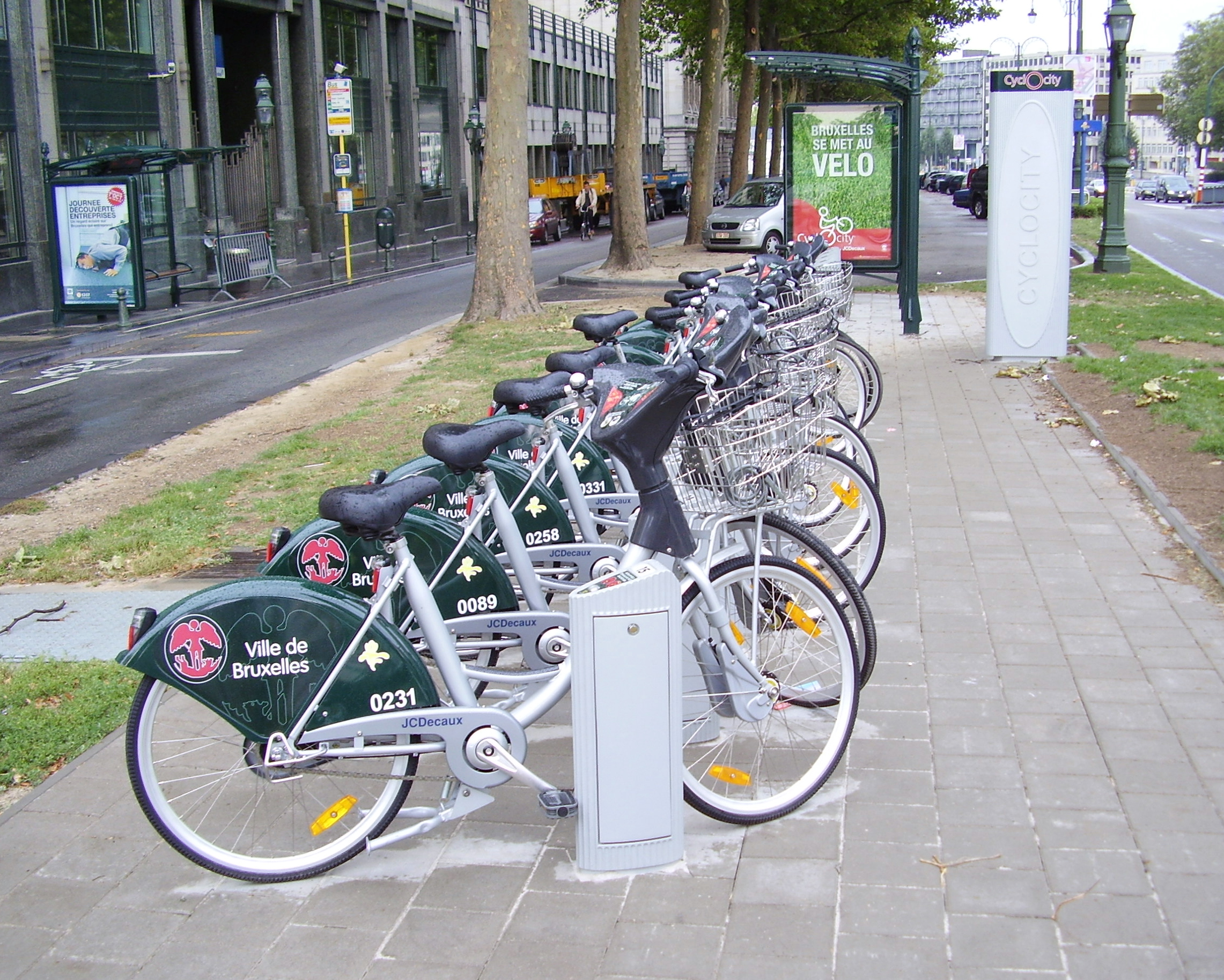
Bicycles of the former Cyclocity programme

== Issues ==
=== Bicycle distribution ===
Stations especially those at greater elevations are regularly empty. Other stations are regularly full. JCDecaux tries to fix this problem by transporting bicycles between stations with special vans but the service is insufficient. The company has said it will expand some stations to address the problem in September 2010. The independent website "Where's My Villo?" uses real-time data to track the performance of Brussels' bike-sharing scheme, Villo!, and aims to get JCDecaux to improve bike availability. Phase 2, to be implemented in 2012 will also see the expansion of some of the most popular stations.

== Stations ==
There are 346 (April 2015) stations in all municipalities of the Brussels-Capital Region.

The density of stations in each municipality varies from 0.3 to 4.5 stations/km^{2}.The five most used stations are (in 2011):

- Brussels-Luxembourg railway station (5845 uses/month)
- Flagey (4,598/month)
- Celtes (3,060/month)
- Bourse/Beurs (3,037/month)
- Lesbroussart (2,624/month)

The five least used stations are (in 2011):

- Van Lint (125 uses/month)
- Heliotropes (164 uses/month)
- Sainte-Anne (188 uses/month)
- Hopital français (222 uses/month)
- Tref centrum (236 uses/month)

Average monthly usage per station was 1,251.

Municipality	No. of stations	Area (km^{2})	Density (station/km^{2})
Anderlecht	5	17,7	0,3
Berchem-Sainte-Agathe	2	2,9	0,7
City of Brussels	59	32,6	1,8
Etterbeek	10	3,1	3,2
Ixelles	27	6,3	4,3
Jette	8	5,0	1,6
Koekelberg	5	1,2	4,2
Molenbeek-Saint-Jean	10	5,9	1,7
Saint-Gilles	11	2,5	4,4
Saint-Josse-ten-Noode	5	1,1	4,4
Schaerbeek	38	8,1	4,5

Details of the stations:

Stations with numbers 1–200.
No	Name in French	Streetname in French	Municipality
1	Leopold	avenue de Tervueren	Woluwe-Saint-Pierre
2	Éloy	rue Éloy	Anderlecht
3	Porte de Flandre	boulevard de Nieuport 1	City of Brussels
4	Jardin aux Fleurs	place du Jardin aux Fleurs	City of Brussels
5	Bourse	rue Paul Delvaux	City of Brussels
6	Gare Centrale	boulevard de l'Impératrice	City of Brussels
7	Parc	rue Royale 66-68	City of Brussels
8	Arts-Loi	avenue des Arts 24	City of Brussels
9	Anneessens	boulevard Maurice Lemonnier 42-46	City of Brussels
10	Chapelle	place de la chapelle	City of Brussels
11	Sablon	rue de la Régence	City of Brussels
12	Trône	avenue des Arts 58	City of Brussels
13	Lemonnier	boulevard Maurice Lemonnier 202-206	City of Brussels
14	Porte de Namur	boulevard du Régent 1	City of Brussels
16	Louise	place Louise 53	Saint-Gilles
18	Gutenberg	square Gutenberg 5	City of Brussels
19	Place Morichar	rue des Étudiants 32-34	Saint-Gilles
20	Palais Royal	rue Royale 14	City of Brussels
21	De Brouckère	place de Brouckère	City of Brussels
22	Jacqmain	boulevard d'Anvers	City of Brussels
23	Agora	place Agora 120	City of Brussels
24	Rogier	boulevard du Jardin Botanique	City of Brussels
25	Porte d'Anderlecht	boulevard Poincaré 27-29	Anderlecht
26	Van Lint	rue Van Lint 6-8	Anderlecht
27	Square Albert Ier	square Albert I 25-27	Anderlecht
28	Clémenceau	chaussée de Mons 159-163	Anderlecht
29	Baudouin	rue de Laeken	City of Brussels
30	Laeken	rue de Laeken 109-119	City of Brussels
31	Musée de la BD	boulevard Pachéco	City of Brussels
32	Dansaert	rue Antoine Dansaert 60-64	City of Brussels
33	Mort Subite	rue Montagne aux Herbes Potagères 7	City of Brussels
34	Fontainas	boulevard Anspach 180-192	City of Brussels
35	Cantersteen	rue Cantersteen 41-45	City of Brussels
36	Place Saint Jean	rue du Lombard 42	City of Brussels
37	Poelaert	place Poelaert 3	City of Brussels
38	Jeu de Balle	rue Blaes 135-141	City of Brussels
39	Hôtel des Monnaies	boulevard de Waterloo 93-98	City of Brussels
40	Porte de Hal	boulevard du Midi 142	City of Brussels
41	Saint Roch	chaussée d'Anvers 37	City of Brussels
42	Porte de Ninove	place de Ninove (boulevard de l'Abattoir)	City of Brussels
43	Joseph II	rue Joseph II	City of Brussels
44	Charlemagne	rue de la Science 11	City of Brussels
45	Stéphanie	avenue Louise 61A-65	City of Brussels
46	Albertine	boulevard de l'Empereur 2	City of Brussels
47	Les Quais	quai à la Chaux 1-2	City of Brussels
48	Congrès	rue Royale 144-148	City of Brussels
49	Willebroeck	quai de Willebroeck 22bis	City of Brussels
50	Ribeaucourt	boulevard Léopold II 121-123	Molenbeek-Saint-Jean
51	Midi Fonsny	rue d'Angleterre	Saint-Gilles
52	Sainctelette	place Sainctelette	Molenbeek-Saint-Jean
53	Gare du Midi	place Victor Horta	Saint-Gilles
54	Tour et Taxis	rue Picard 3	City of Brussels
55	Botanique	avenue Galilée	Saint-Josse-ten-Noode
56	Archimède	rue Archimède 58-64	City of Brussels
57	Madou	rue Scailquin	Saint-Josse-ten-Noode
58	Place du Nord	place du Nord	Saint-Josse-ten-Noode
59	Place Saint Josse	rue Willems 5-11	Saint-Josse-ten-Noode
60	Saint-Lazare	boulevard Saint-Lazare 4-10	Saint-Josse-ten-Noode
61	Maelbeek	chaussée d'Etterbeek 15	City of Brussels
62	Cortenbergh	avenue de Cortenbergh	City of Brussels
64	Vétérinaires	rue de France	Saint-Gilles
65	Parvis de Saint-Gilles	chaussée de Waterloo 65-69	Saint-Gilles
66	Schuman	rue de la Loi 170	City of Brussels
67	Parc du Cinquantenaire	avenue d'Auderghem 45	City of Brussels
68	Jean Rey	place Jean Rey	City of Brussels
69	Lesbroussart	avenue Louise 192	City of Brussels
70	Aurore	avenue Louise 440	City of Brussels
71	Legrand	avenue Louise 525	City of Brussels
72	ULB Franklin Roosevelt	avenue Franklin Roosevelt 19	City of Brussels
73	Vleurgat	avenue Louise 300	City of Brussels
74	Place Loix	rue Berckmans 78-84	Saint-Gilles
75	Général Baron	avenue du Parc 55	Saint-Gilles
76	Place Van Meenen	avenue Paul Dejaer 35-39	Saint-Gilles
77	Paul Janson	chaussée de Charleroi 159	Saint-Gilles
78	Duc Petiaux	chaussée de Charleroi	Saint-Gilles
79	Loi	rue de Trèves 126-128	City of Brussels
80	Céres	avenue Franklin Roosevelt 14	City of Brussels
81	Pont Bockstael	boulevard Emile Bockstael 5	City of Brussels
82	Pannenhuis	rue Charles Demeer 71	City of Brussels
83	Simonis	boulevard Léopold II 282	Koekelberg
84	Sainte-Anne	rue de l'Église Sainte-Anne 116	Koekelberg
85	Etangs Noirs	chaussée de Gand	Molenbeek-Saint-Jean
86	Maison comm. de Jette	chaussée de Wemmel 102	Jette
87	Miroir	avenue de Laeken 36	Jette
88	Woeste	avenue Notre Dame de Lourdes	Jette
89	Athenée de Jette	avenue de Levis Mirepoix 100	Jette
90	Broustin	avenue de Jette 73-81	Koekelberg
91	Belgica	place Philippe Werrie 24	Jette
92	Lenoir	boulevard de Smet de Naeyer 187-189	Jette
93	Clovis	chaussée de Louvain 260-264	City of Brussels
94	Duchesse de Brabant	rue de Birmingham	Molenbeek-Saint-Jean
95	Place Bockstael	boulevard Émile Bockstael 254	City of Brussels
96	Hôtel Président	boulevard du Roi Albert II	City of Brussels
97	Karreveld	chaussée de Gand 1-3	Molenbeek-Saint-Jean
98	Cimetière	boulevard Louis Mettewie	Molenbeek-Saint-Jean
99	Jubilé	boulevard du Jubilé 79	Molenbeek-Saint-Jean
100	Gare du Luxembourg	rue de Trèves	Ixelles
101	Parnasse	rue du Trône 111-113	Ixelles
102	Museum	chaussée de Wavre 229-233	Ixelles
103	Ernest Solvay	rue de l'Arbre Bénit 2-6	Ixelles
104	Fernand Cocq	place Fernand Cocq 19-23	Ixelles
105	De Hennin	chaussée d'Ixelles 254-260	Ixelles
106	Germoir	avenue de la Couronne 92-96	Ixelles
107	Defacqz	rue Defacqz 25-29	Ixelles
108	Flagey	place Eugène Flagey 11	Ixelles
109	Chatelain	rue de l'Aqueduc 115-119	Ixelles
110	Rodin	avenue de la Couronne 145D	Ixelles
111	Leemans	place Albert Leemans 13-14	Ixelles
112	Page	chaussée de Waterloo 440-442	Ixelles
113	Abbaye de la Cambre	avenue Émile Duray 2	Ixelles
114	de Beco	avenue Émile de Beco 128	Ixelles
115	Petite Suisse	place de la Petite Suisse 16-18	Ixelles
116	Fraiteur	boulevard de la Plaine ( entrée ULB)	Ixelles
117	Cimetière d'Ixelles	avenue de l'Université 1-5	Ixelles
118	Buyl	avenue Adolphe Buyl 1-3	Ixelles
119	Paquot	rue Jean Paquot 44-48	Ixelles
120	Blyckaerts	place Raymond Blyckaerts	Ixelles
121	Étangs	rue Guillaume Stocq 1-5	Ixelles
122	Gare d'Etterbeek	boulevard Général Jacques	Ixelles
123	Van Eyck	chaussée de Vleurgat 215-217	Ixelles
124	Charles Graux	chaussée de Waterloo 585-587	Ixelles
125	Georges Brugmann	place Georges Brugmann 10-11	Ixelles
127	Gray	rue des Deux Ponts 4	Ixelles
133	Château	avenue du Château	Koekelberg
134	Bastogne	place de Bastogne	Koekelberg
135	Parc Lacroix	avenue Princesse Élisabeth	Schaerbeek
136	Pavillon	place du Pavillon 92-96	Schaerbeek
137	Maison Com. de Sch.	rue Royale Sainte-Marie 241-245	Schaerbeek
138	Houffalize	place de Houffalize	Schaerbeek
139	Liedts	place Liedts 38	Schaerbeek
140	Azalées	avenue des Azalées 68	Schaerbeek
141	Gare du Nord	boulevard Simon Bolivar	Schaerbeek
142	Bienfaiteurs	avenue Rogier 269-271	Schaerbeek
143	RTL	chaussée de Louvain 770	Schaerbeek
144	Sainte-Marie	rue Royale 257-259	Schaerbeek
145	Coteaux	avenue Rogier 128	Schaerbeek
146	Léopold III	boulevard Léopold III	Schaerbeek
147	Lycée Émile Max	chaussée de Haecht 226-230	Schaerbeek
148	Gare de Meiser	avenue Rogier 377-379	Schaerbeek
149	Jules Lebrun	chaussée de Louvain 593	Schaerbeek
150	Meiser	place Général Meiser 1-3	Schaerbeek
151	Louvain	chaussée de Louvain 488-494	Schaerbeek
152	Place Dailly	place Dailly 24-25	Schaerbeek
153	Square Armand Steurs	avenue Paul Deschanel 267-269	Schaerbeek
154	Plasky	square Eugène Plasky 100	Schaerbeek
156	Jamblinne de Meux	place de Jamblinne de Meux 43-45	Schaerbeek
157	Héliotropes	boulevard Lambermont 374	Schaerbeek
158	Van Ysendijck	avenue Voltaire 6	Schaerbeek
159	Masui	avenue de la Reine 153	Schaerbeek
160	Princesse Élisabeth	place Princesse Élisabeth 8-19	Schaerbeek
161	Demolder	avenue Eugène Demolder 68	Schaerbeek
162	Brabant	rue de Quatrecht 39	Schaerbeek
163	Chazal	avenue Ernest Cambier 7	Schaerbeek
164	Kennis	boulevard Lambermont 284	Schaerbeek
165	Cimetière de Jette	boulevard de Smet de Naeyer 322	Jette
166	Tref centrum	rue Amélie Gomand 45-51	Jette
167	Charles V	avenue Charles Quint 129-131	Berchem-Sainte-Agathe
168	Hôpital Français	avenue Josse Goffin 133-135	Berchem-Sainte-Agathe
169	Eekhoud	avenue Georges Eekhoud 56	Schaerbeek
170	Riga	square François Riga	Schaerbeek
171	Apollo	square Apollo	Schaerbeek
172	Aéropolis	chaussée de Haecht 586	Schaerbeek
173	Bichon	place Bichon	Schaerbeek
174	Mennekens	avenue Brigade Piron 80-84	Molenbeek-Saint-Jean
175	Beekant	boulevard Edmond Machtens	Molenbeek-Saint-Jean
176	Colonel Bourg	rue Colonel Bourg 104	Schaerbeek
177	Chasseurs Ardennais	rue du Noyer 81-87	City of Brussels
178	Diamant	boulevard Auguste Reyers	Schaerbeek
179	Celtes	avenue de Tervueren 17	Etterbeek
180	Jourdan	rue Froissart 3-5	Etterbeek
181	Louis Titz	avenue de la Chasse 182-184	Etterbeek
182	Boileau	boulevard Saint-Michel	Etterbeek
183	La Chasse	avenue des Casernes 4-6	Etterbeek
184	Philippe Baucq	rue Philippe Baucq 32-38	Etterbeek
185	Père de Deken	rue Père de Deken	Etterbeek
186	Étangs	chaussée de Wavre 490	Etterbeek
187	Arsenal	boulevard Louis Schmidt 2	Etterbeek
188	Osseghem	avenue Mahatma Gandhi	Molenbeek-Saint-Jean
189	Place Van Meyel	place Van Meyel	Etterbeek
190	Terdelt	place Terdelt	Schaerbeek
191	Artan	avenue Clays	Schaerbeek
192	Auberge de jeunesse	rue Delaunoy	Molenbeek-Saint-Jean
193	Gare de l'ouest	chaussée de Ninove	Molenbeek-Saint-Jean
194	Stuyvenberg	avenue Houba de Strooper	City of Brussels
195	Westland Shopping	boulevard Sylvain Dupuis	Anderlecht
196	Prince de Liège	chaussée de Ninove	Anderlecht
197	De Smet	place Henri de Smet	Anderlecht
198	Scheut	chaussée de Ninove	Molenbeek-Saint-Jean
199	Henri Rey	boulevard Felix Paulsen	Anderlecht
200	Vétérans Coloniaux	boulevard Jules Graindor	Anderlecht
