= Styr & Ställ =

Public bicycle rental program in Gothenburg, Sweden

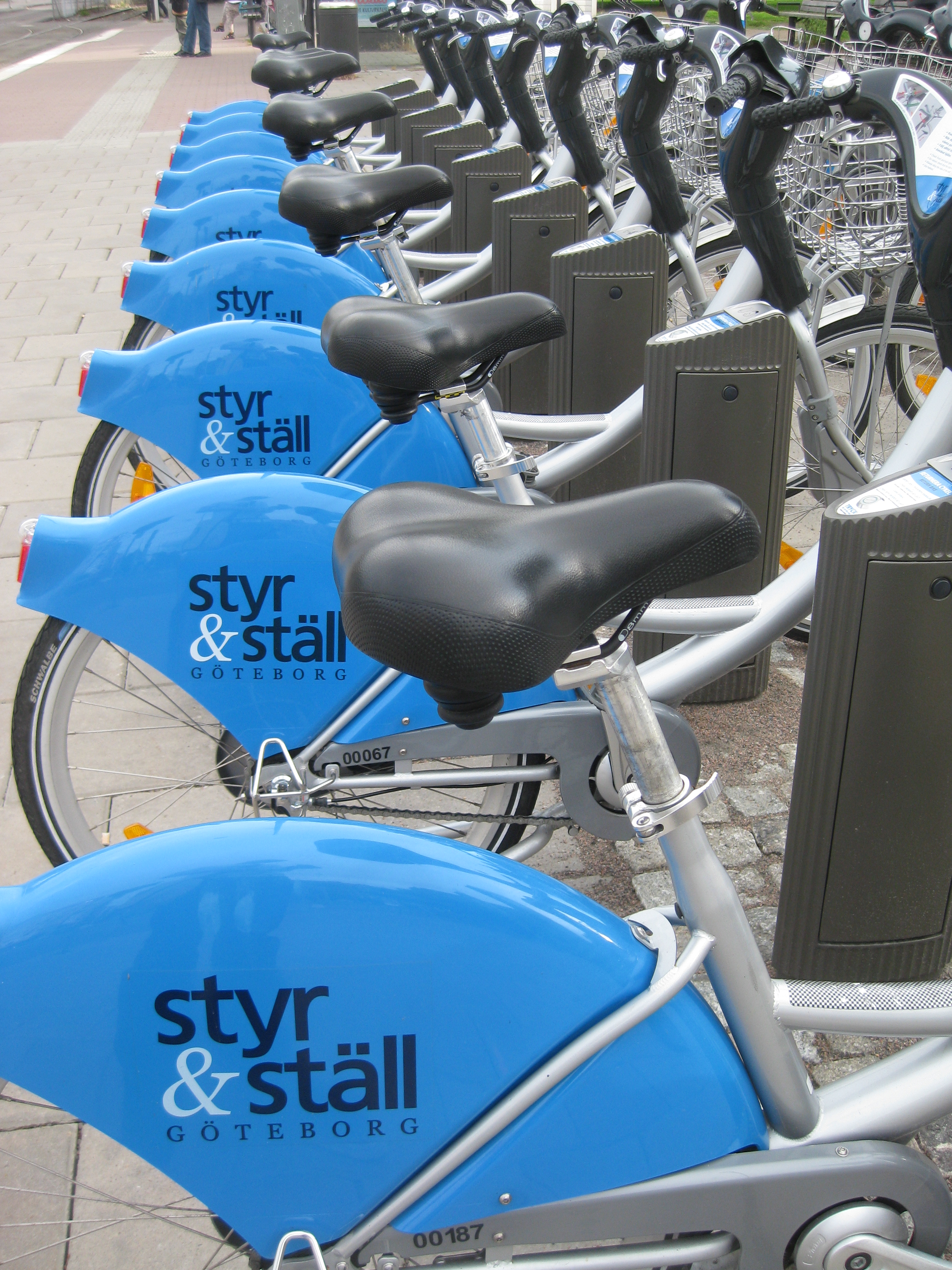
Bikes parked in one of the systems stations at Linnéplatsen.

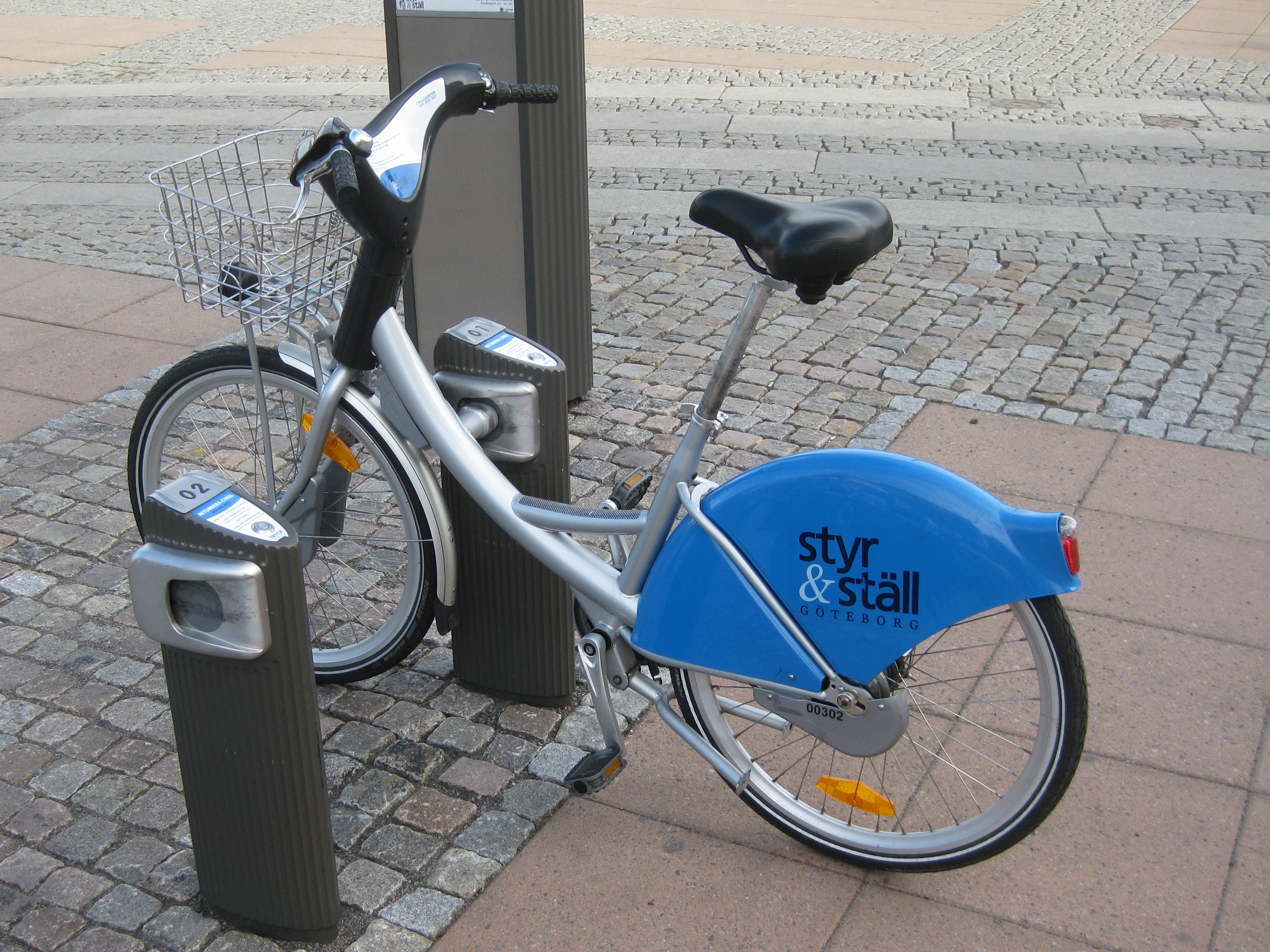
Parked bicycle.

Styr & ställ is a public bicycle rental program in Gothenburg, Sweden. It was launched on 10 August 2010 and is used by both tourists and citizens of Gothenburg. Anyone with a subscription can rent one of the 1,000 bikes, from one of the 60 stations located around the city.

== History ==
=== 2010 ===
The system was launched on 10 August and consisted of 600 bikes and 50 stations. The price for a season ticket was 100 kronor (€11.41 as of October 2013), and 10 kronor for a three-day subscription.

=== 2011 ===
The season lasted from 1 April to 31 October and the number of bikes increased to 700. The price for a season ticket was 250 kronor. From 1 April to 30 June, 1,087 people started a season subscription and 6,960 three-day cards were sold.

=== 2012 ===
Over the year, there were over 202,000 leases and 18,000 subscribers, and the number of leases since the launch in 2010 passed 500,000.

=== 2013 ===
The season has been extended and reaches from 1 March to 30 November. The price for a season subscription has been reduced to 125 kronor, the number of bikes has increased to 1,000 and the number of stations to 60.

=== 2014 ===
In 2014, the season has been extended from 1 March to 31 December. The price for a season subscription has been further reduced to 75 kronor, while the number of bikes and stations remains constant.

=== Usage statistics ===
Year	subscribers	trips	reference
2011	22,840	180,500	
2012	18,030	201,200	
2013	24,640	420,500	
2014	28,000	668,000	
