= Vélo'v =

Bicycle-sharing system in Lyon, France

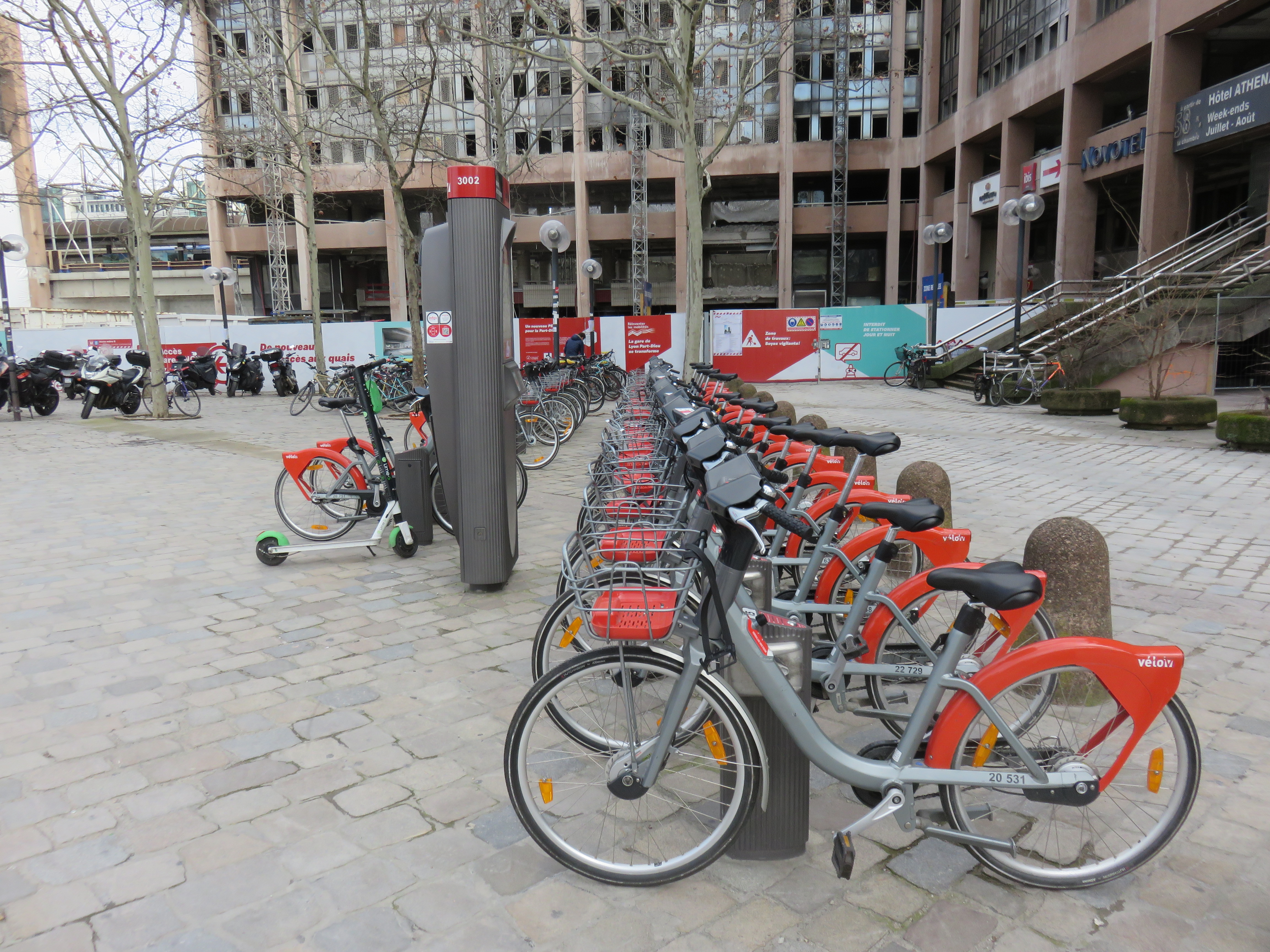
- A Vélo'v station

Overview
- Locale: Lyon, France
- Transit type: Bicycle-sharing system
- Number of stations: 349
- Website: velov.grandlyon.com

Operation
- Began operation: 19 May 2005; 21 years ago
- Operator: JCDecaux
- Number of vehicles: 4,000

Vélo'v (French: [velɔv]) is a bicycle-sharing system running in the city of Lyon, France, in conjunction with the advertising company JCDecaux. It has been the pioneer of smart bicycle-sharing systems, previous systems being more ad hoc and run similar to a charity.

The relationship with JCDecaux allows the city to provide the service on a cost neutral basis for the city, and at a very low cost to users, in return for providing exclusive advertising access on bus shelters and the like. The primary aim is to reduce vehicle traffic within the city. The scheme also aims to reduce pollution, create a convivial atmosphere within the city, and encourage the health benefits of increased activity.

Its name is a portmanteau of French vélo ("bike") and English "love". The first bicycle-sharing system to open in France, after the pioneering 1974 scheme in La Rochelle, its success inspired similar systems in major French and European cities, including Paris's Vélib' in 2007. With the success of these two high-profile smart bicycle sharing systems a new paradigm of government supporting bike sharing as a part of a public transportation network emerged. It is still the bike-share scheme with the second-highest market penetration (1 bike per 121 residents) in the world, after the Vélib'.

== Overview ==
The system began on May 19, 2005, and now provides over 3000 bicycles available from over 350 stations situated around the cities of Lyon and Villeurbanne. The aim is to have stations within 300m of every point in the city. The bicycles can be returned to any of the 350 stations. Access is via a subscription system in which a card is purchased online or at a station giving the user an account and a PIN with which they access bicycles through a terminal situated at the bicycle stations.

Rentals can last from less than 30 minutes up to 24 hours and are available to anyone 14 years and over holding a Carte Vélo'v (subscription card for the service), tourists can buy a 1- or 7-day card for the cycles using a credit card.

The June 2006 edition of the Vélo'v newsletter reported that over 22,000 rentals per day were made by the over 52,000 subscribers to the service, an increase of 44% in a year, and representing 6,400,000 km traveled for the year.

In 2010, Velo'v data was analyzed by a cross-disciplinary team, who found some interesting patterns, such as higher average speeds on Wednesdays, speeds that outpaced cars during peak hours, and an average trip length of 14.7 minutes.

In 2017 there were nearly 25,000 daily rentals, more than 8 million trips in the year and 68,500 long-term subscribers.

In January 2025, 2,500 new electric Vélo’v bicycles were introduced to complement the existing fleet of mechanical bikes, aiming to enhance cycling accessibility, particularly in elevated areas of the territory.

== Bicycles ==
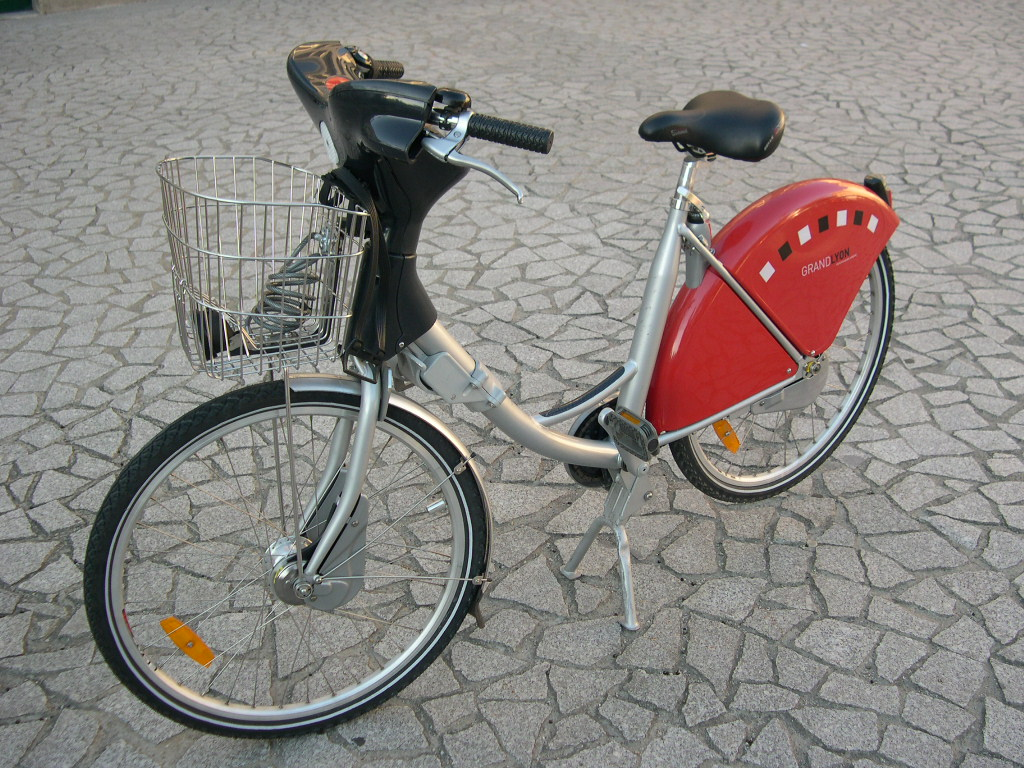
A Vélo'v Bicycle

Vélo'v bicycles, along with a lock and basket, contain electronic components which allow the bicycle to be identified by the stations, allow tracking of kilometers traveled, tracking the condition of the bicycles, (lights, brakes, dynamo), and collection of detailed statistics about the usage of the bicycles.

== Controversy ==
Despite its prominent presence in the city of Lyon, there have been multiple instances of discontent with tourists using their services. The company advertises a very low price to rent a bike for a short amount of time, but fails to clearly indicate that the user has to pay an additional fee per half hour of using the bike. Since the user gives Velo'v access to their credit card, the company can deduct this money without further notification. This, in combination with the absence of a clearly indicated e-mail address to contact the company, resulted in bad reviews on different platforms on the internet.

== Video game ==
For the 2006 edition of the Festival of Lights, Lyon had been partly modelized in order to create a video game named Velo've raced in Lyon, created by B2B Games. Pedestrians could play for free from 7 to 10 December and the game was broadcast on screens on place de la République.

== See also ==
- Outline of cycling
- Short term hire schemes
