= Vélib' =

Bicycle sharing system in Paris, France

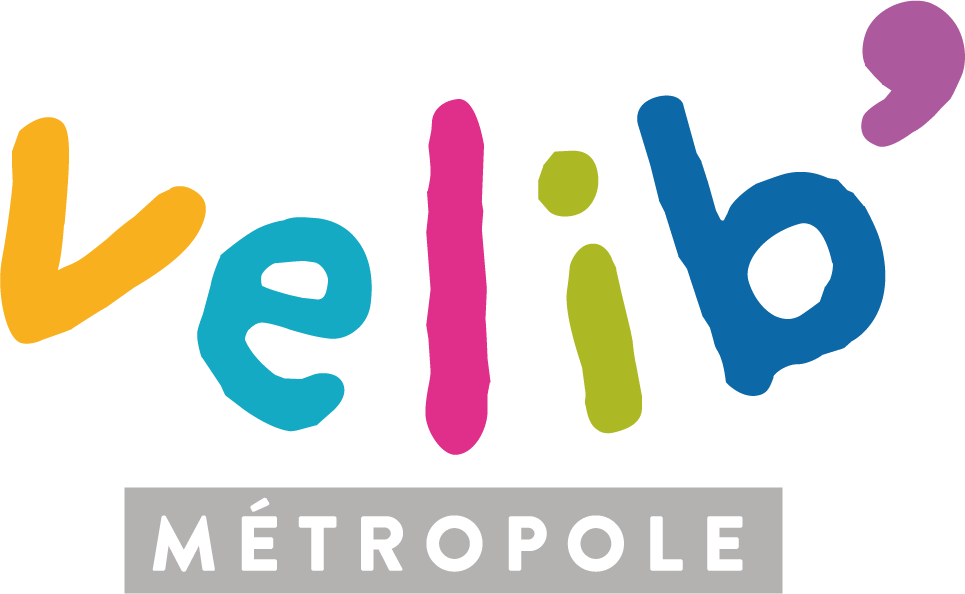

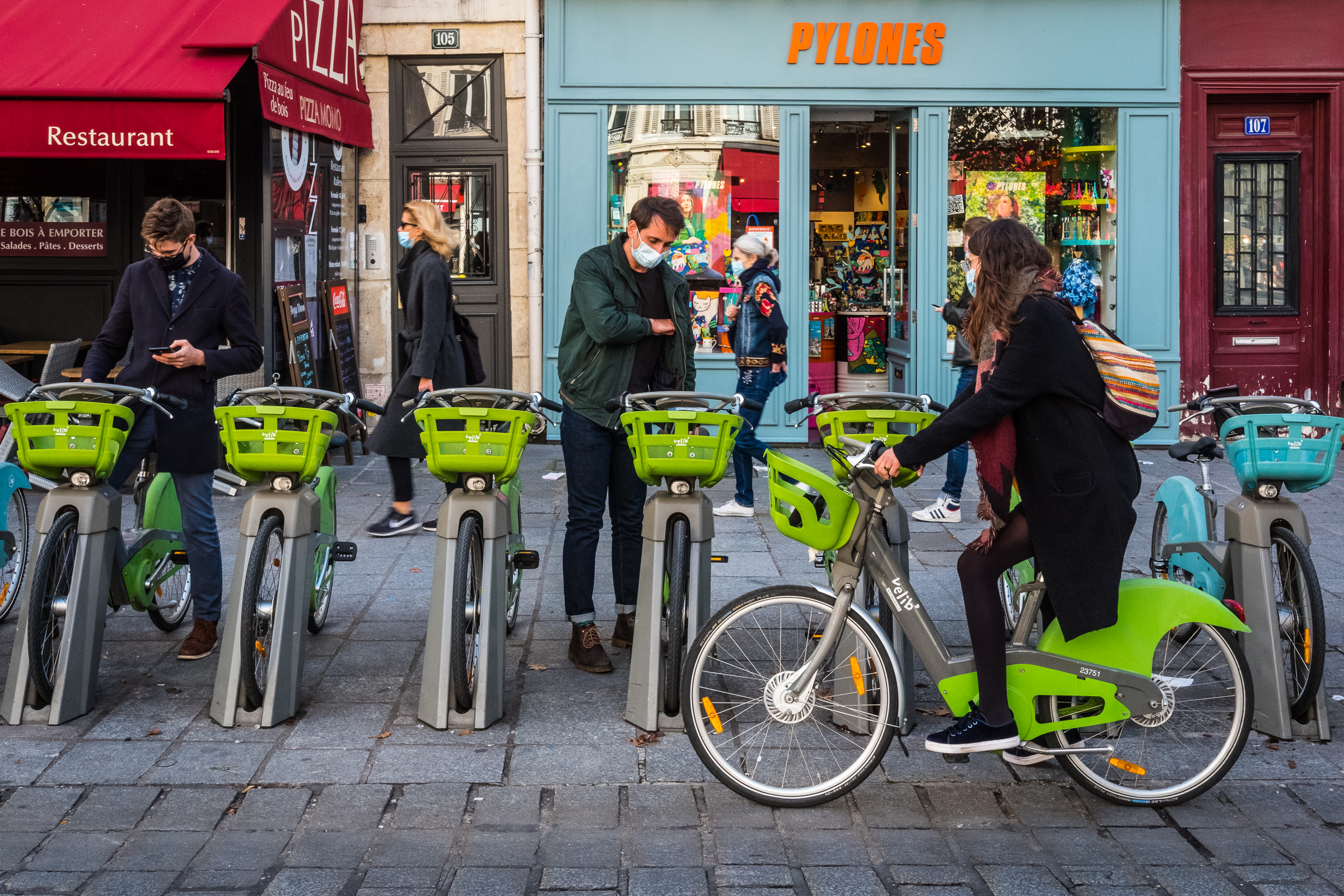

Overview
- Owner: Paris and surrounding cities
- Locale: Paris and surrounding cities
- Transit type: Bicycle sharing system
- Number of stations: 1,465
- Daily ridership: 390,000 annual subscribers (2022)

Operation
- Began operation: 15 July 2007
- Operators: JCDecaux (2007–2017); Smovengo (since 2017)
- Number of vehicles: 18,200

Vélib' Métropole (French: [velib metʁɔpɔl]) is a large-scale public bicycle sharing system in Paris, France. The system encompasses more than 16,000 bikes and 1,400 stations. The name Vélib' is a portmanteau of the French words vélo ("bicycle") and liberté ("freedom").

Vélib' was operated originally as a concession by the French advertising corporation JCDecaux (under the company Somupi). Launched on 15 July 2007, the system encompassed around 14,500 bicycles and 1,400 bicycle stations, located across Paris and in some surrounding municipalities, with an average daily ridership of 85,811 in 2011. As of 2014, Vélib' was the world's 12th-largest bikesharing program by the number of bicycles in circulation; the rest of the top 18 are in Chinese cities. As of July 2013, Velib' had the highest market penetration with 1 bike per 97 inhabitants, followed by Vélo'v in Lyon with 1 bike per 121 residents, and Hangzhou in China with 1 per 145. From 2011 to 2018, Vélib' was complemented by Autolib', an electric car sharing scheme operating on similar principles.

As of 2018, Vélib' has been rebranded as Vélib' Métropole, and is now operated by Smovengo. It has since been expanded to 55 cities around Paris.

== History ==
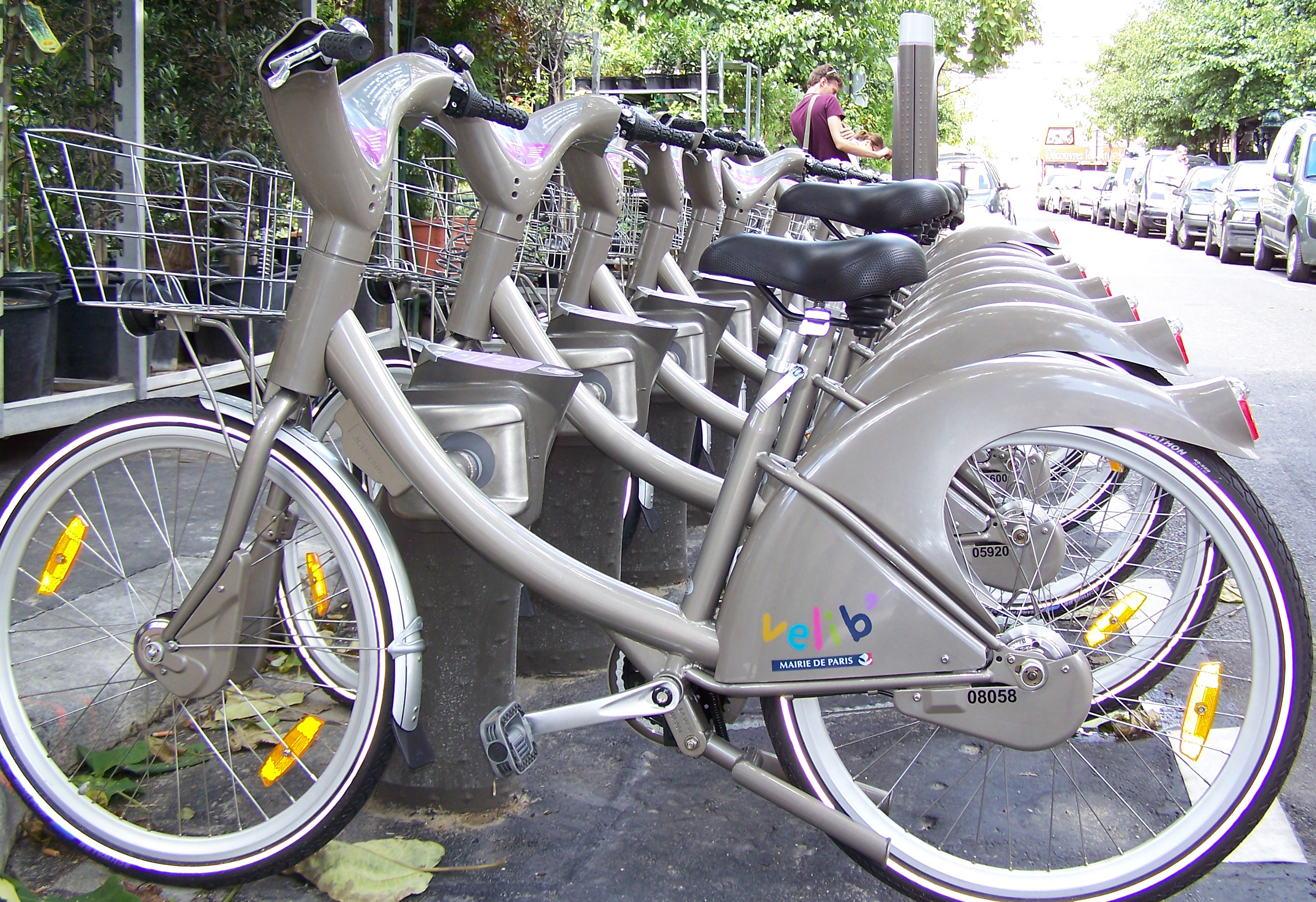
A former Vélib' station with its distinctive grey bicycles (2007–2018).

The initiative was proposed by Paris Mayor and Socialist Party member Bertrand Delanoë. The system was launched on 15 July 2007 following Lyon's success of its contactless system Vélo'v in May 2005, the pioneering scheme in June 1998 of LE vélo STAR in Rennes, the first free public network (25 stations) with electronic identification of the bikes but which used magnetic cards or earlier the simple bicycle-sharing system of La Rochelle in 1974. Velib' initially introduced to the city 7,000 bicycles, distributed among 750 automated rental stations, with fifteen or more bicycle parking slots each. The following year the initiative was enlarged to some 16,000 bicycles and 1,200 rental stations, with roughly one station every 300 metres (980 ft) throughout the city centre. making Vélib' the third-most-extensive system of its kind in the world in 2013, surpassed in station numbers only by systems in Hangzhou and Wuhan in China. During its first year in operation, Vélib' reported 20 million trips made, and at its sixth anniversary, a total of 173 million journeys were reported.

As of 1 January 2018, Velib' has been rebranded as Vélib' Métropole. It is now operated by Smovengo. The service is operating in Paris and 64 surrounding cities. After many technical issues at relaunch, the City of Paris set an ultimatum to resolve service problems by September 2018 which seemed to work as the system is slowly recovering in January 2019. Velib' now also offers electric bicycles, in turquoise, distinct from its regular bicycles in green.

== System ==
The system's bicycles are produced in Hungary by the French bicycle company Mercier and are repaired by JCDecaux. The price per bicycle has been variously stated as US$500, $1,300 (if provided by JCDecaux), €300, $3,460, or $3,500 apiece. They are three-speed bicycles, each weighing approximately 22.5 kilograms (50 pounds). Vélib' bikes are equipped with a locking system, a front basket and always-on LED lighting powered by a front-hub dynamo.

Each Vélib' station is equipped with an automatic rental terminal, a map of other nearby stations and stands for dozens of bicycles. The rental terminals also display information about neighbouring Vélib' stations, including location, number of available bicycles and open stands. If a user arrives with a rented bicycle at a station without open spots, the terminal grants another fifteen minutes of free rental time. A fleet of 23 bicycle-transporting vehicles are used daily to redistribute bicycles between empty and full stations.

=== Rates ===
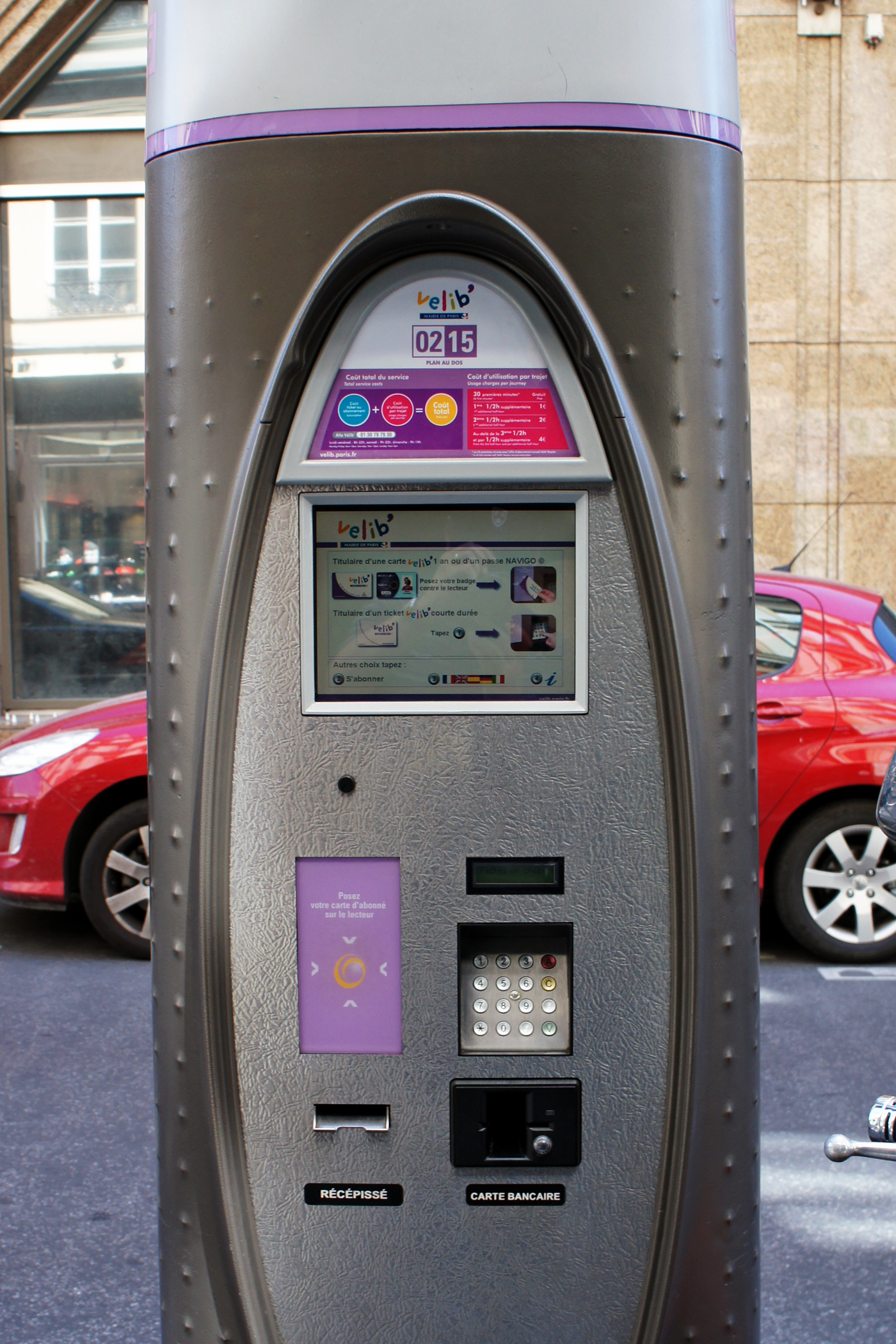
An automated Vélib' pay station (2007–2018).

Current system prices are available on the Vélib website.

To use the system, users buy a subscription, which allows an unlimited number of rentals. With a subscription, bike rental is free for the first half-hour of every individual trip; an unlimited number of such free trips can be made per day. A trip that lasts longer than 30 minutes incurs an additional charge for each subsequent 30‑minute period. The increasing price scale is intended to keep the bikes in circulation. The subscription price is reduced for users aged under 26 or over 60.

Returning a bicycle to some stations located above an altitude of 60 metres gives free minutes of rental, that are credited to the user's account and can be used for future rentals exceeding 30 minutes.

A credit card or debit card with a PIN is required to sign up for the program and to rent the bikes. The credit/debit card is charged a €300 deposit, to protect against bikes not being returned. The credit card is required to contain an EMV chip to get a subscription at a station; short-term subscription can also be purchased online. 1‑day and 1‑week subscribers are given a subscription number to be used for future rentals during their subscription period, while 1‑year subscribers are sent an RFID card. All types of sign-up can also be attached to a Navigo pass. The RFID card and Navigo pass allow direct use of the card readers at Vélib stations.

=== Financing ===
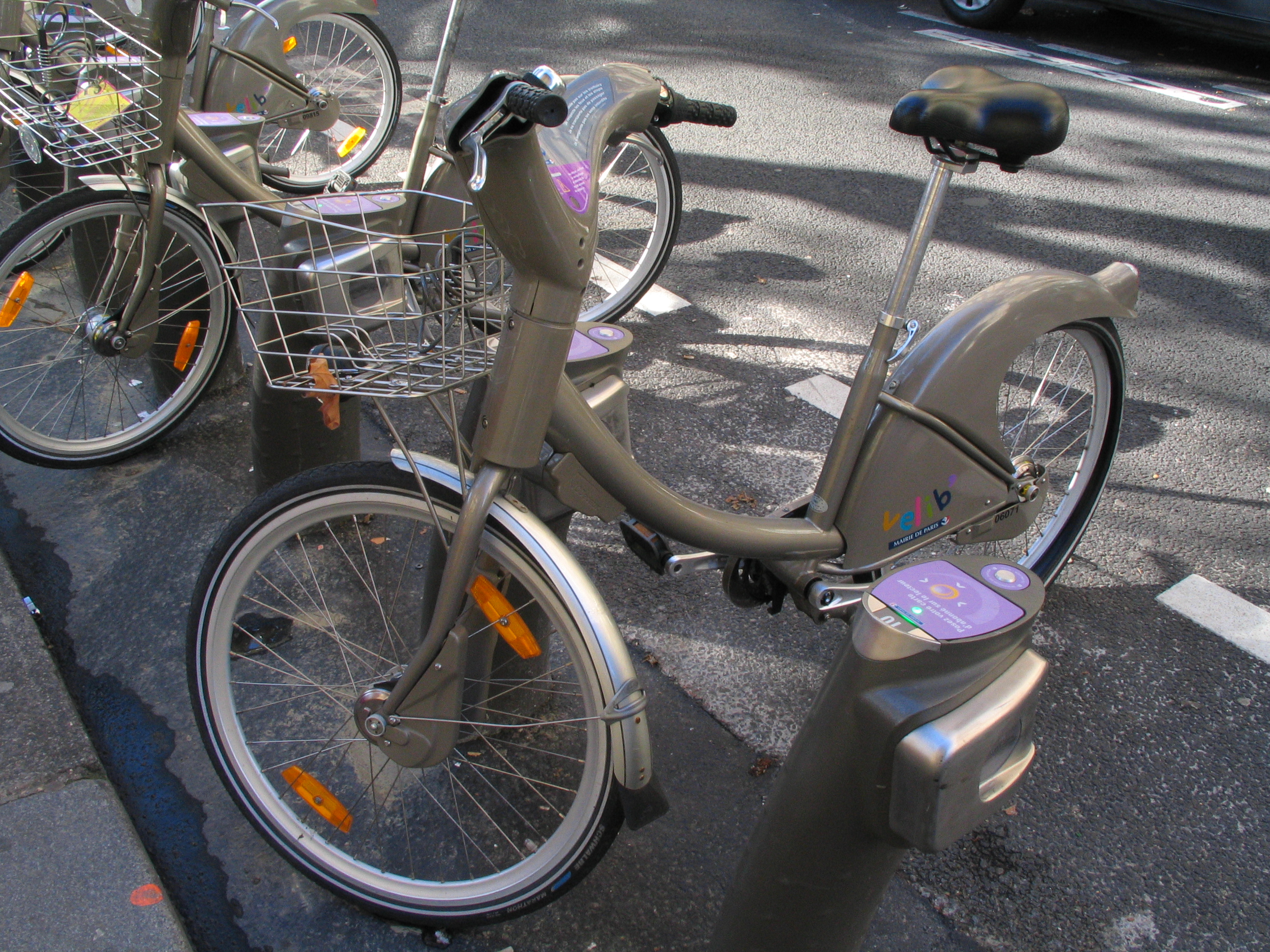
Bike attachment points at a Vélib' station (2007–2018).

The system was originally financed by the JCDecaux advertising corporation, in return for the city of Paris signing over the income from a substantial portion of on‑street advertising hoardings. JCDecaux won the contract over a rival bid from Clear Channel.

JCDecaux paid the system start-up costs, totalling about $140 million, and employed around 285 people full-time to operate the system and repair bikes, under a ten-year contract. The city received all revenue from the program, as well as a fee of about $4.3 million a year. In return, JCDecaux received exclusive control over 1,628 city-owned billboards; the city receives about half of that advertising space at no charge for public-interest advertising (slightly different numbers were reported in July 2008). This model was first used in France in 1998 by Adshel (now part of Clear Channel) in Rennes.

Due to an unexpectedly high rate of vandalism compared to the Lyon bicycle hire system, the Paris City Council agreed to pay replacement costs of $500 per vandalised bicycle, leading to unexpected costs of up to €2 million per year.

== Issues ==
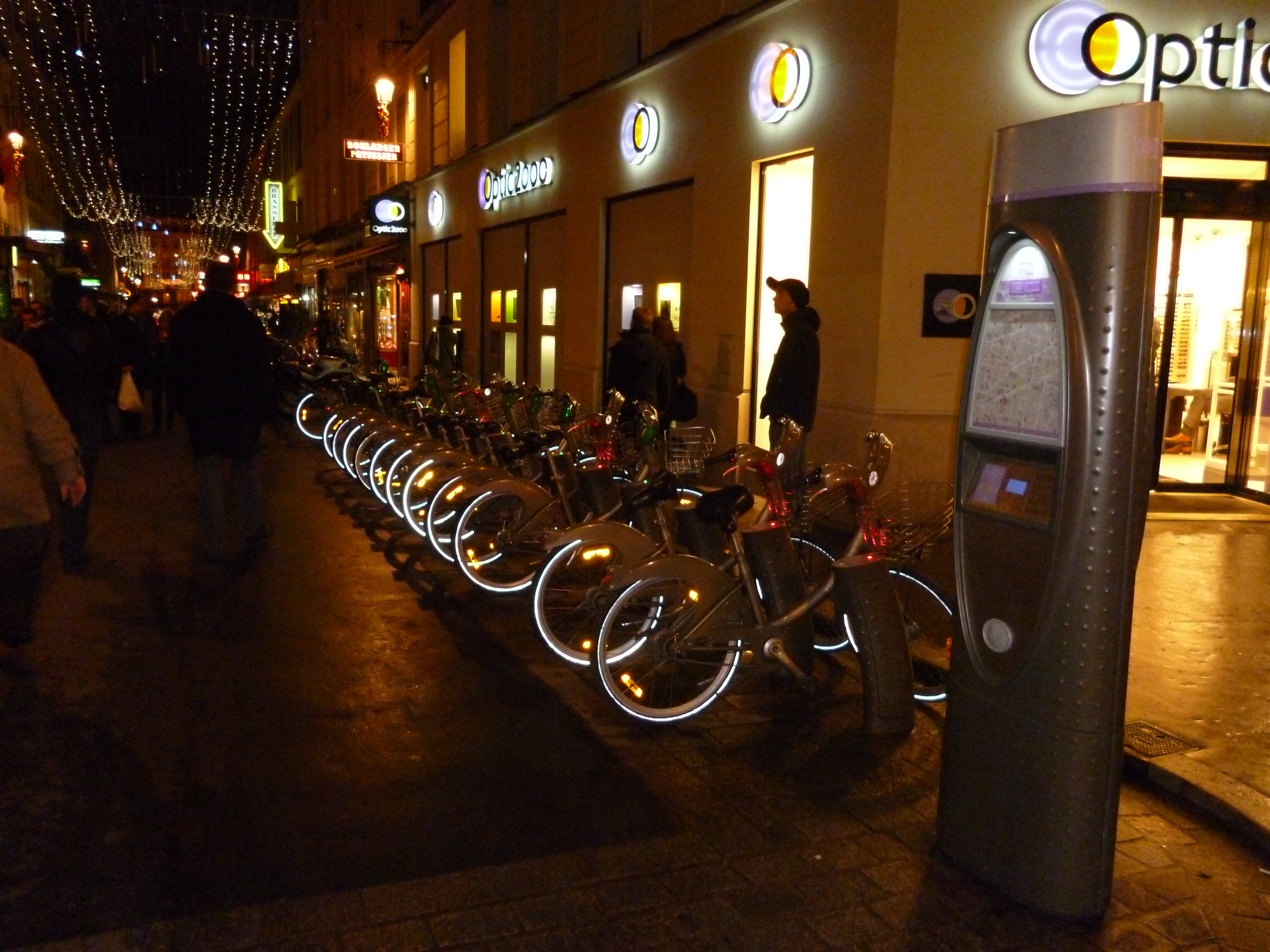
Velib' station at night, Cadet Street.

=== Theft and vandalism ===
At least 3,000 bicycles were stolen in the first year of operation, a number far greater than had been initially anticipated. By August 2009, of 20,600 bikes introduced into service, about 16,000 – some 80% of the total – had been replaced due to vandalism or theft; of the latter, fully 8,000 were stolen. Stolen Vélib' bicycles turned up in shipping containers destined for North Africa, and in cities as far away as Brașov and Bucharest, Romania. Vandalized cycles were sometimes thrown in the River Seine, or hung from lampposts. In 2009, the New York Times reported that it was common to see Vélib' bicycles in their docking stations with flat tires, broken pedals, or other damage. In 2012, however, the Financial Times reported that "attrition rates have fallen significantly" since the first two years of the program. While maintenance continues to be an issue, the FT attributed this to "the difficulty of keeping up with the results of heavy use" of the "popular service", in addition to willful damage or theft.

JCDecaux officials told reporters that they underestimated the degree of potential losses from vandalism and theft, which had not significantly affected earlier JCDecaux-administered bike sharing programs in France, such as Vélo'v in Lyon. In 2009 and in 2012, repair and maintenance efforts in Paris were reportedly running at some 1,500 Vélib bicycles per day, focusing mainly on tire re-inflation. "The system is very costly in terms of implementation," the head of JCDecaux's board of directors said in 2012. "But since 2011 it has achieved budgetary balance, after losing money during the first three years." While JCDecaux does not disclose exact figures, according to Inter Press Service the system was expected to be profitable in 2012 as well.

Vandalism and theft of Vélib' cycles received a wave of press coverage in 2009, with some stories citing JCDecaux staff as their only source. Some French officials and academics said that while real problems existed, such coverage exaggerated their scope, reflecting an effort by JCDecaux to strengthen its bargaining position in financial negotiations with Paris authorities. "Decaux is using media sensationalism to obtain more money from the city of Paris," said Denis Baupin, the city's former Deputy Mayor for Transportation. "It's in large part a PR issue," commented Luc Nadal of the Institute for Transportation and Development Policy. JCDecaux declined reporters' requests for comment.

Sociologist Bruno Marzloff interpreted the unexpected vandalism rate as a symptom of revolt against French society by the suburban and urban poor, especially immigrant youth resentful of what they perceive as privileged bo-bos or "bourgeois-bohemians", the trend-conscious French urban middle class that are seen as the principal users of the Vélib' system. "One must relate this to other incivilities, and especially the burning of cars," Marzloff said in 2009. referring to the 2005 riots in the capital's working-class suburbs. He described Vélib' vandalism as in part "a form of rebellion" against social exclusion, an "outcry ... that means, 'We don't have the right to mobility like other people, to get to Paris it's a huge pain, we don't have cars, and when we do, it's too expensive and too far.' "

The program's critics have cited the Vélib' program as a prime example of the economic principle of the tragedy of the commons. Supporters say that despite its initial problems, Vélib has become a model of innovation in urban public services.

=== Maintenance ===
Issues have surfaced on how to safeguard riders from hiring a returned and damaged Vélib cycle or a cycle requiring immediate maintenance. To indicate when there is a problem with the bike, it has become common for returning users to rotate the seat through 180 degrees to point backward. While this practice assists staff in determining which bikes require immediate attention, it depends for its success on substantial voluntary user compliance.

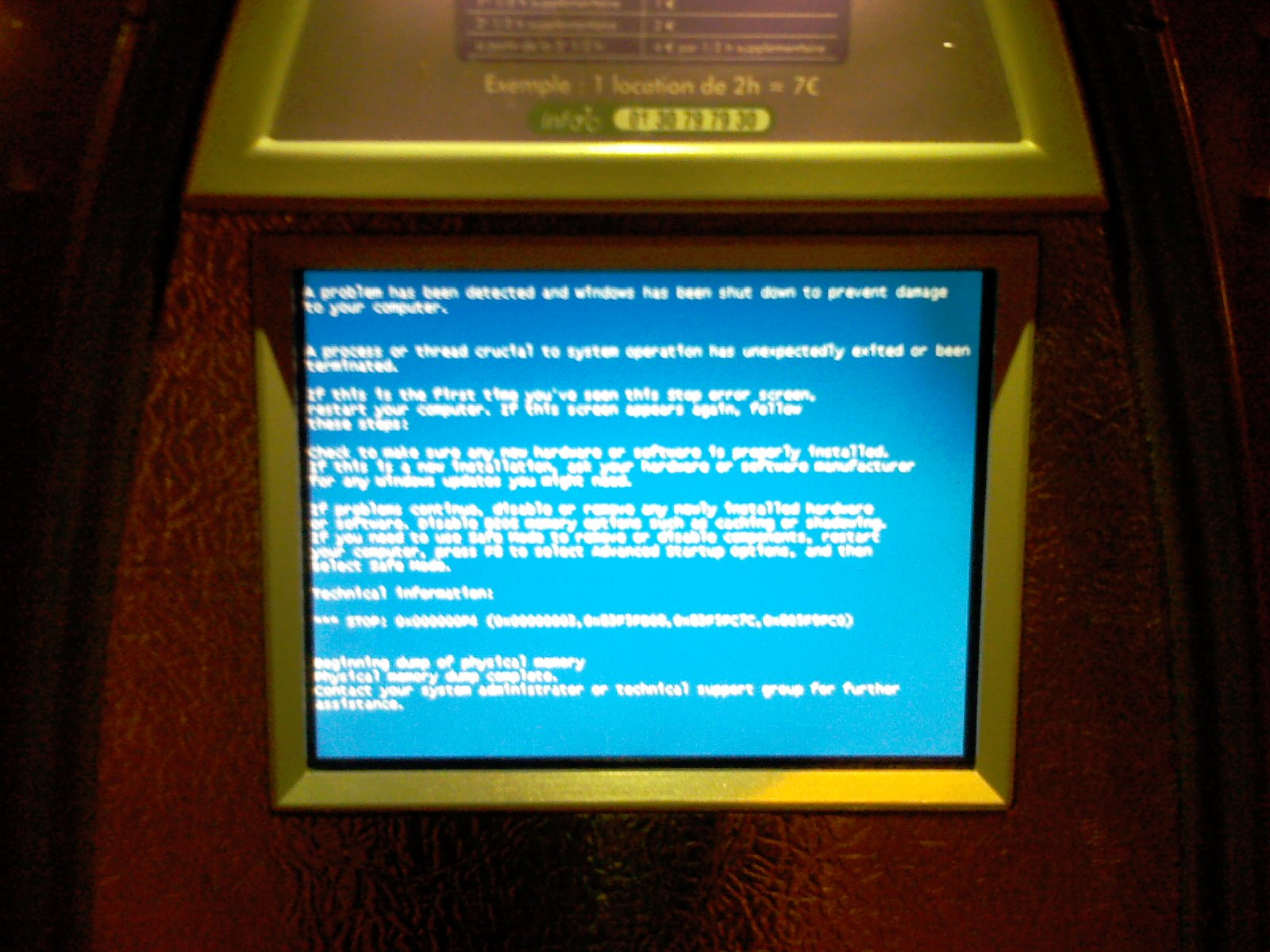
BSoD on a Vélib' station in 2009.

Timing differences of up to 30 minutes exist between clocks of different rental stations due to poor synchronisation, and may give rise to overbilling or underbilling. The mayor of Paris has given assurances that overcharges will be reimbursed. Rental stations use the Microsoft Windows operating system and have been known to crash, giving the infamous blue screen of death.

=== Demand ===
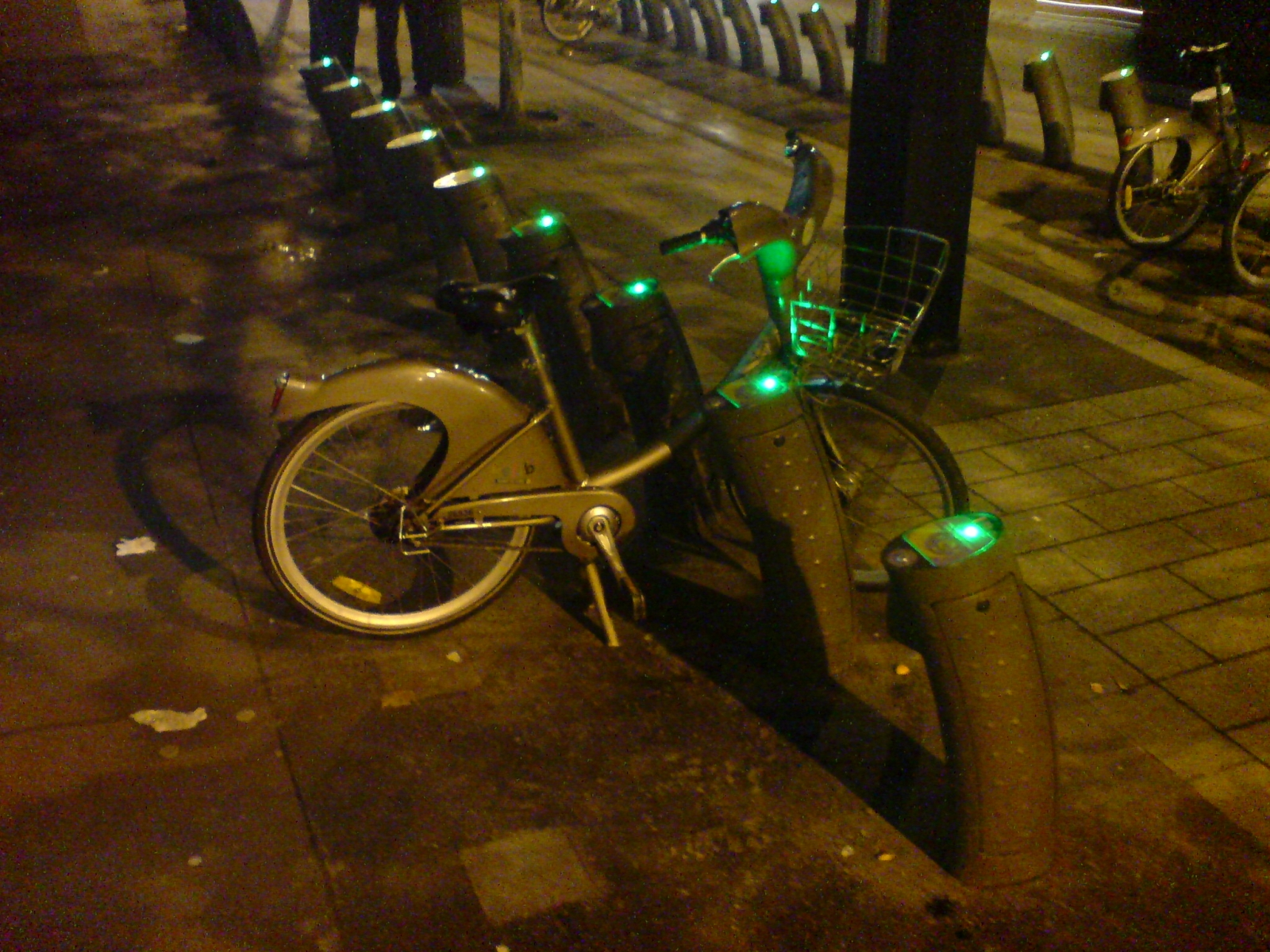
A Vélib bicycle rack with nearly all its bicycles taken.

There are frequent disparities between the availability of rental bicycles and the number of rental slots. Each rental station indicates the number of bicycles available at the nearest stations.

Demand can be high during the working week and during transport strikes. Although rental bicycles are not dedicated, it has been known for people to chain a bicycle to its station so that it will remain available to them for a subsequent trip. Vélib' has declared this to be uncivil behaviour, and Vélib' employees are authorised to cut the locks in these cases.

Stations at greater elevations generally experience greater demand. In addition, there is a net inflow of bicycles from the outskirts to the city centre earlier in the day, and a net flow outwards in the evening. Thus, depending on the time of day, Vélib needs to manage the demand at its outermost and centremost stations. Consequently, bicycles may be completely unavailable in some locations, whilst parking problems exist for others.

Vélib' faces logistical issues, and must relocate bikes during the course of each day. There are proposals to make adjustments to the system's pricing mechanism. The "bonus V'+" bonus system was put in place on 14 June 2008 in an effort to adjust the demand level. Fifteen minutes of free cycling time is credited to users who rent bicycles from stations without the logo (mostly situated at the edge of the city and more than 60 m above sea level) and drop bicycles off at stations where the logo is displayed.

Due to continuing high demand, the Vélib' scheme was extended to neighbouring councils (up to 1.5 km beyond the boundaries of Paris) in 2008.

== See also ==
- Intermodal passenger transport
- Outline of cycling
- Dutch OV-fiets bike-sharing program
- BIXI Montréal, a similar product in Montréal, Québec.
