= Kanda, Tokyo =

Area in Chiyoda-ku, Tokyo, Japan

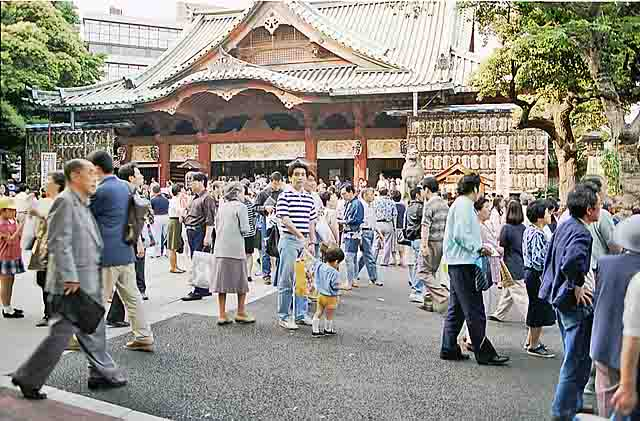
Festival at Kanda Myojin

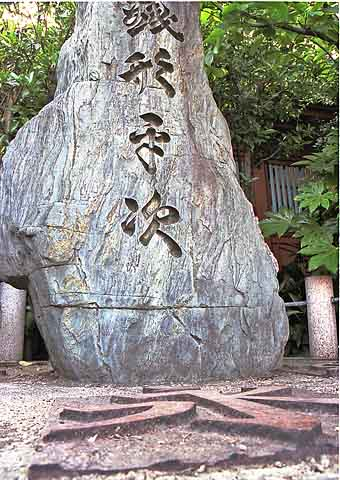
Monument to Zenigata Heiji

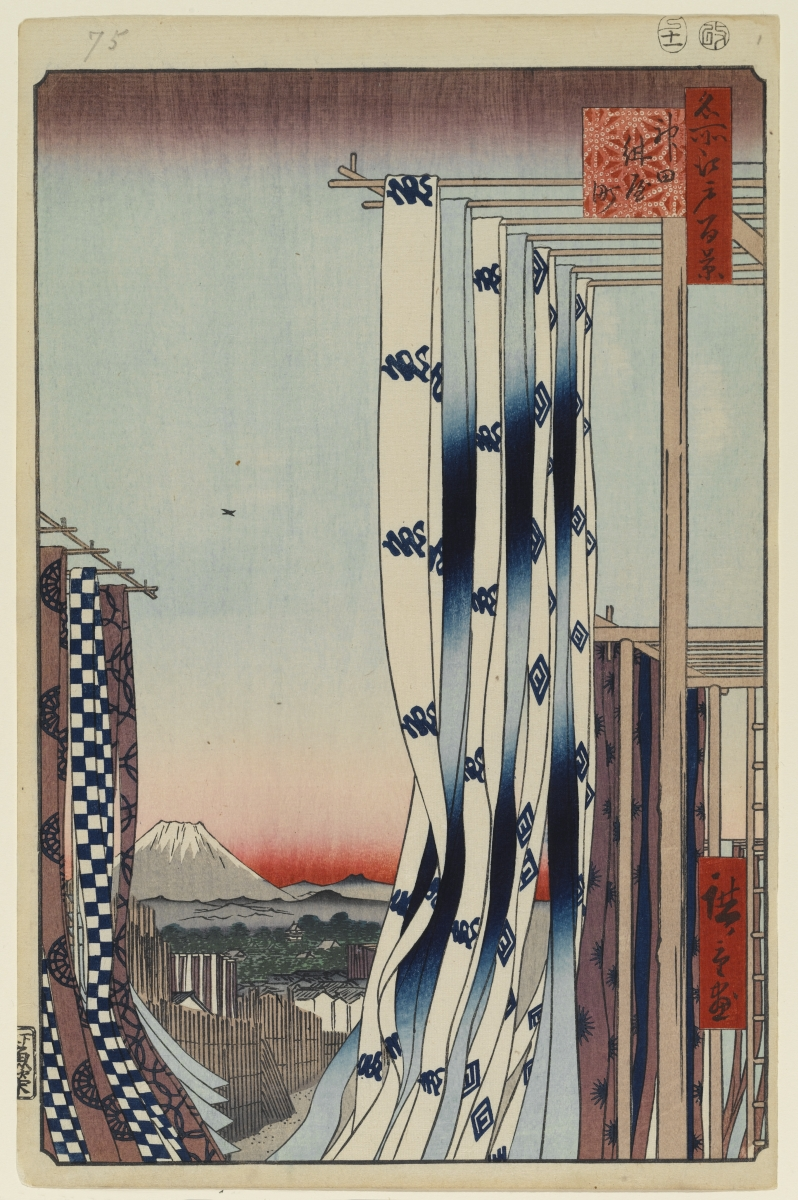
Hiroshige, the dyers' district of Kanda

Kanda (神田) is an area in northeastern Chiyoda, Tokyo, Japan. It encompasses about thirty neighborhoods. Kanda was a ward prior to 1947. When the 35 wards of Tokyo were reorganized into 23, it was merged with Kojimachi to form the modern Chiyoda.

Kanda, together with Nihonbashi and Kyobashi, is the core of Shitamachi, the original downtown center of Edo-Tokyo, before the rise of newer secondary centers such as Shinjuku and Shibuya.

It is home to the Kanda Myojin (Shinto) shrine, devoted to the ancient rebel Taira no Masakado, who led an uprising against the central government during the Heian period with the aim of establishing himself as "Shinnō" (New Emperor) of an eastern Court. In the Edo period, the shrine's festival was one of the three most noted in the city. It is also home to the "Mausoleum of Confucius at Yushima", a temple dedicated to Confucianism.

Kanda is the home of the Tokyo Resurrection Cathedral which was built by Nicholas of Japan and is the main Cathedral of the Japanese Orthodox Church.

A popular Japanese franchise, Zenigata Heiji, from the literary series by Kodô Nomura, features a fictitious police patrolman (the title character) whose beat is Kanda. Near the end of every show, Heiji fells the dastardly villain by throwing a coin at him.

== Economy ==
The Japanese offices of American Megatrends are in Parkside 1 Building (パークサイド1ビル) in Tsukasamachi.

== Neighborhoods ==
- Aioichō
- Awajichō
- Hanaokachō
- Higashi-Kanda
- Higashikonyachō
- Higashimatsushitachō
- Hirakawachō
- Iwamotochō
- Izumichō
- Jinbōchō - the largest bookstore district in Japan
- Kajichō
- Kanda-Misakichō
- Kanda-Sarugakuchō
- Kitanorimonochō
- Konyachō
- Matsunagachō
- Mikurachō
- Mitoshirochō
- Neribeichō
- Nishifukudachō
- Nishi-Kanda
- Nishikichō
- Ogawamachi
- Sakumachō
- Sakumagashi
- Soto-Kanda - Akihabara
- Sudachō
- Surugadai
- Tachō
- Tomiyamachō
- Tsukasamachi
- Uchi-Kanda

== See also ==
- Kanda River
- Kanda Station (Tokyo)
