= Nishifukudachō, Tokyo =

District of Chiyoda, Tokyo, Japan

Coordinates: 35.6913°N 139.7742°E

Nishifukudachō (西福田町), officially Kanda-Nishifukudachō (神田西福田町), is a district of Chiyoda, Tokyo, Japan. It is a part of the former ward of Kanda. As of April 1, 2007, its population is 17. Its postal code is 101-0037.

This district is located on the northeastern part of Chiyoda Ward. It borders Kanda-Higashikonyachō on the north, Iwamotochō on the east, Kanda-Mikurachō on the south, and Kajichō on the west.

Located near the east exit of Kanda Station, it is a commercial district with numerous office building and stores.

== Education ==
Chiyoda Board of Education operates public elementary and junior high schools. Chiyoda Elementary School (千代田小学校) is the zoned elementary school for Kanda-Nishifukudachō. There is a freedom of choice system for junior high schools in Chiyoda Ward, and so there are no specific junior high school zones.
