= Awajichō, Tokyo =

District of Chiyoda, Tokyo, Japan

Coordinates: 35°41′49″N 139°46′3″E

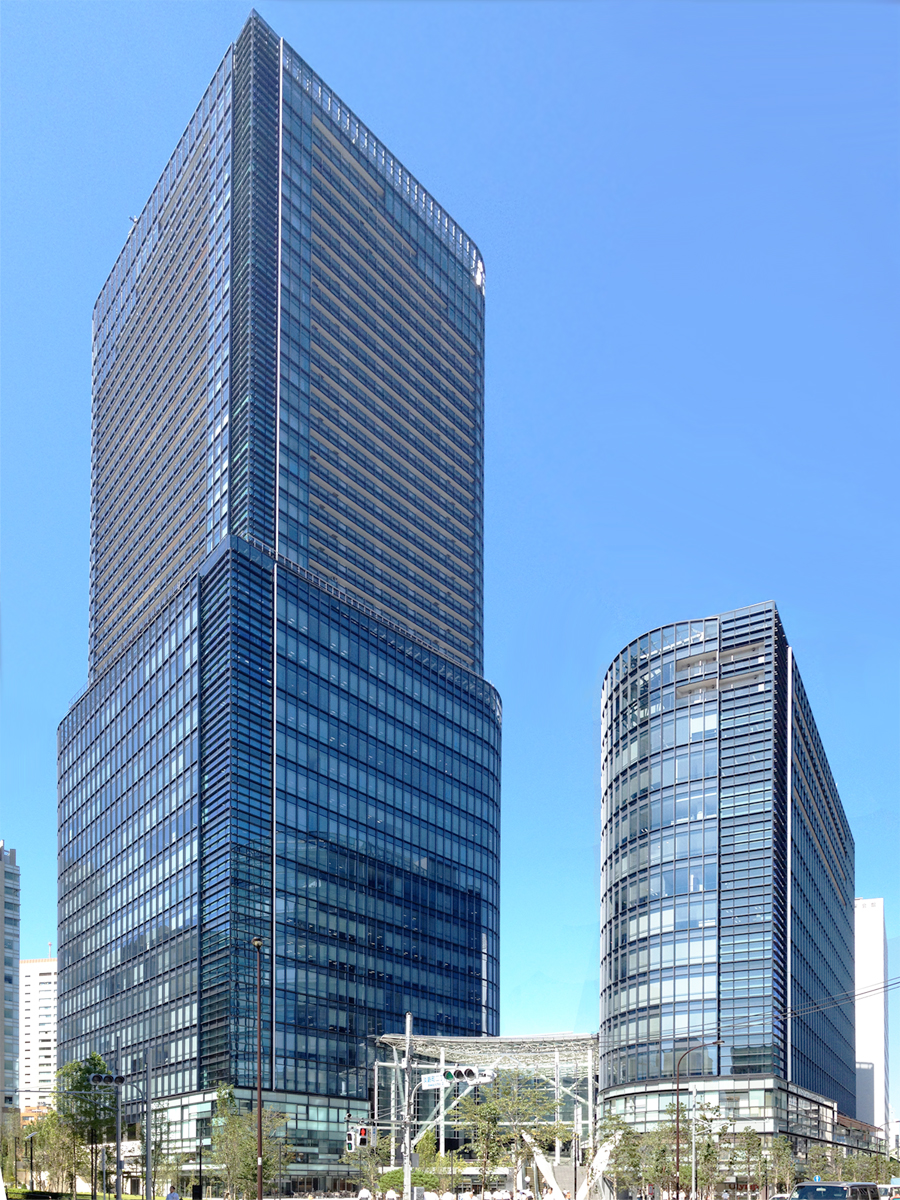
Waterras

Awajichō (淡路町; Japanese pronunciation: [ä̀.β̞ä́.(ɟ͡)ʑí.c̟͡ɕó̞ó̞]), or officially Kanda-Awajichō (神田淡路町) is a district of Chiyoda, Tokyo, Japan, consisting of 1-chōme and 2-chōme. As of April 1, 2007, the district's population is 543.

Awajichō is located in the northern part of Chiyoda. It borders Soto-Kanda to the north, Kanda-Sudachō to the east, Kanda-Ogawamachi to the south, and Kanda-Surugadai to the west.

== Companies based in Awajichō ==
DIC Corporation, a global chemical company is headquartered in the district.

== Education ==
Chiyoda Board of Education operates public elementary and junior high schools. Shōhei Elementary School (千代田区立昌平小学校) is the zoned elementary school for Kanda-Awajichō 1-2 chōme. There is a freedom of choice system for junior high schools in Chiyoda Ward, and so there are no specific junior high school zones.
