= Higashimatsushitachō, Tokyo =

District of Chiyoda, Tokyo, Japan

Coordinates: 35.695°N 139.773°E

Higashimatsushitachō (東松下町), or officially Kanda-Higashimatsushitachō (神田東松下町), is a district of Chiyoda, Tokyo, Japan. As of April 1, 2007, the district's population is 198. Its postal code is 101-0042.

Kanda-Higashimatsushitachō is located on the northeastern part. It borders Kanda-Sudachō to the north, Iwamotochō and Kanda-Iwamotochō to the east, Kanda-Higashikonyachō to the south, Kanda-Konyachō and Kanda-Tomiyamachō to the southwest, and Kanda-Kajichō to the west.

Kanda-Higashimatsushitachō is a business district located near the east exit of the Kanda Station.

== Education ==
Chiyoda Board of Education operates public elementary and junior high schools. Chiyoda Elementary School (千代田小学校) is the zoned elementary school for Higashimatsushitachō. There is a freedom of choice system for junior high schools in Chiyoda Ward, and so there are no specific junior high school zones.
