= Mikurachō, Tokyo =

District of Chiyoda, Tokyo, Japan

Mikurachō (美倉町), officially Kanda-Mikurachō (神田美倉町), is a district of Chiyoda, Tokyo, Japan. It is a part of the former ward of Kanda. Its postal code is 101-0038.

== Geography ==
Located on the northern part of Chiyoda Ward, this district is adjacent to Chūō Ward (Nihonbashi-Hongokuchō and Yaesu). It borders Kanda-Nishifukudachō on the north, Iwamotochō on the east, and Kajichō on the west.

== Education ==
Chiyoda Board of Education operates public elementary and junior high schools. Chiyoda Elementary School (千代田小学校) is the zoned elementary school for Kanda-Mikurachō. There is a freedom of choice system for junior high schools in Chiyoda Ward, and so there are no specific junior high school zones.
