= Tsukasamachi, Tokyo =

District of Chiyoda, Tokyo, Japan

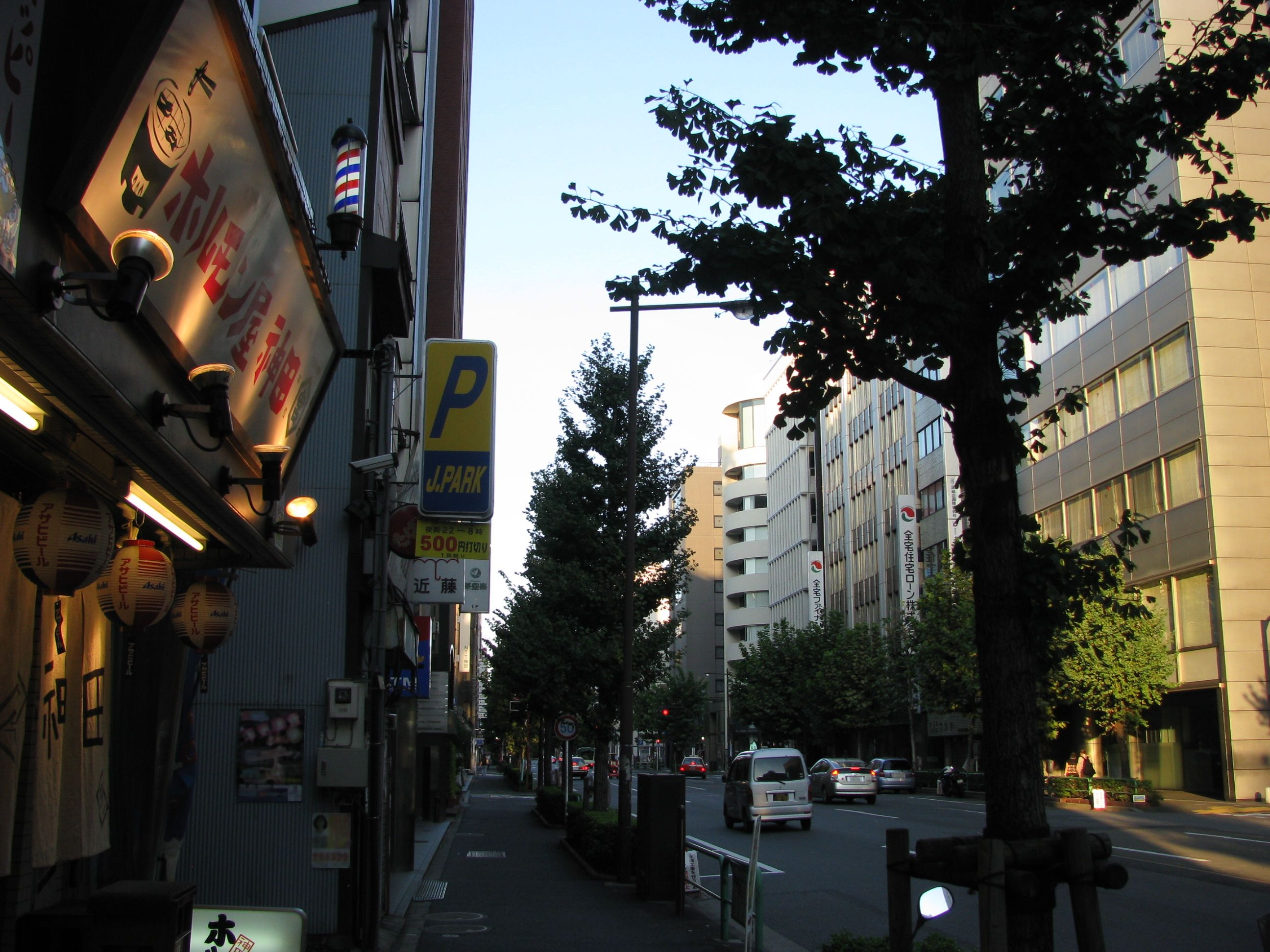
Kanda-Tsukasamachi

Tsukasamachi (司町), officially Kanda-Tsukasamachi (神田司町), is a district of Chiyoda, Tokyo, Japan. Today, it consists only of Kanda-Tsukasamachi 2-chōme. As of April 1, 2007, its population is 420. Its postal code is 101-0048.

Kanda-Tsukasamachi is located on the northern part of Chiyoda Ward. It borders Kanda-Ogawamachi and Kanda-Sudachō to the north, Kanda-Tachō to the east, (across Kanda-Keisatsu-Dōri Ave.) Uchi-Kanda to the south, and Kanda-Mitoshirochō to the west.

== Companies with Head Offices in Tsukasamachi ==
- Otsuka Pharmaceutical Co.
- Earth Chemical Co.
- Otsuka Beverage Co.
- Toa Shoji Co.
- The Japanese offices of American Megatrends are in Parkside 1 Building (パークサイド1ビル) in Tsukasamachi.

== Education ==
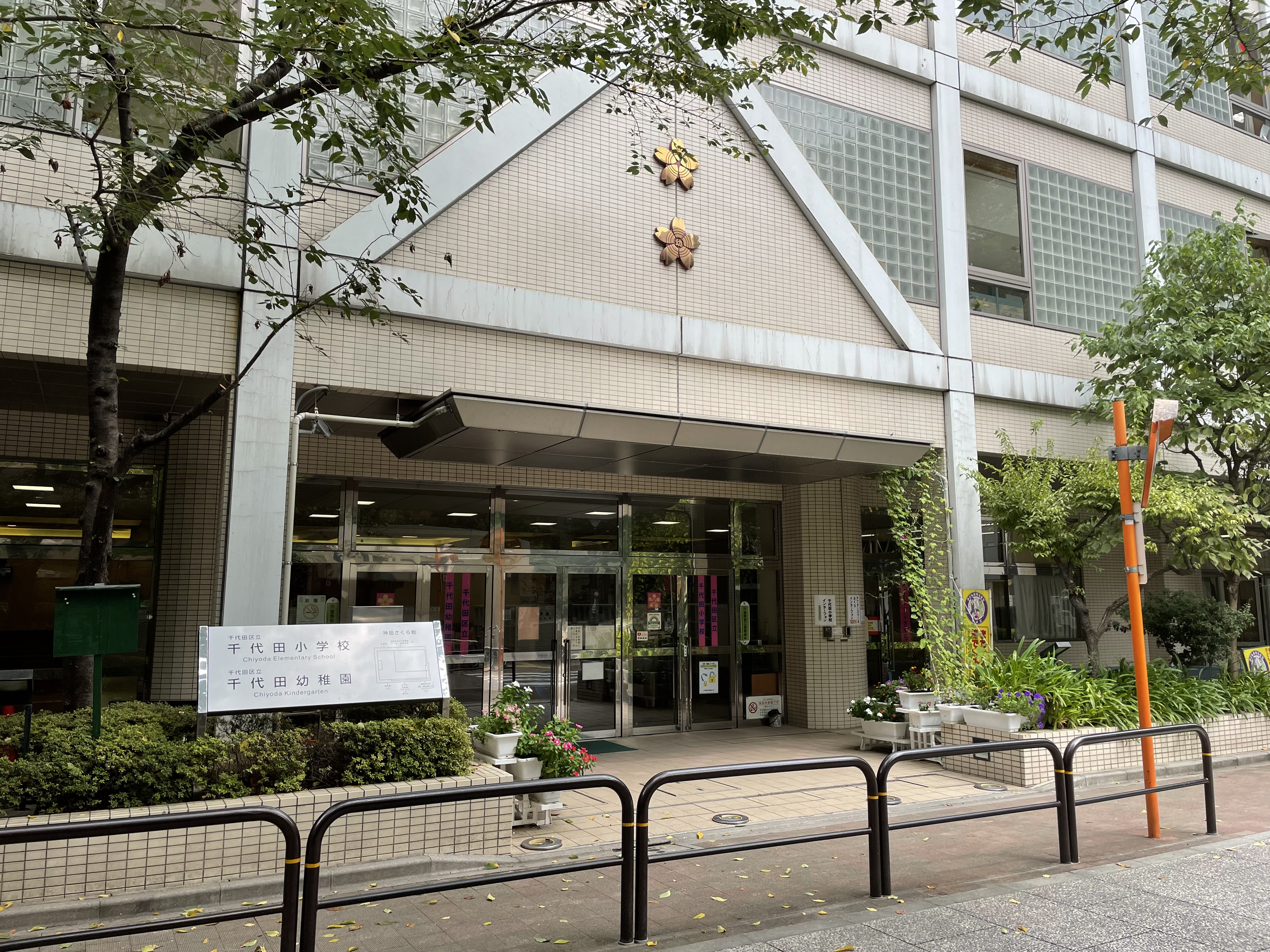
Chiyoda Elementary School (千代田区立千代田小学校)

Chiyoda Board of Education operates public elementary and junior high schools. Chiyoda Elementary School (千代田区立千代田小学校) is the zoned elementary school for Kanda-Tsukasamachi 2 chōme. Chiyoda Elementary, in Kanda-Tsukasamachi, occupies the former Kanda Elementary School (神田小学校). It was created in April 1993 (Heisei 5) as a merger of Chisakura Elementary School (千桜小学校) and Kanda Elementary, and it also took a portion of the former boundary of Nagatatcho Elementary School (永田町小学校). The school initially used the Chisakura building. The current building began being built in December 1995 (Heisei 7). In 1998 (Heisei 10) the school moved into the current facility.

There is a freedom of choice system for junior high schools in Chiyoda Ward, and so there are no specific junior high school zones.
