= Nishikichō =

District of Chiyoda, Tokyo, Japan

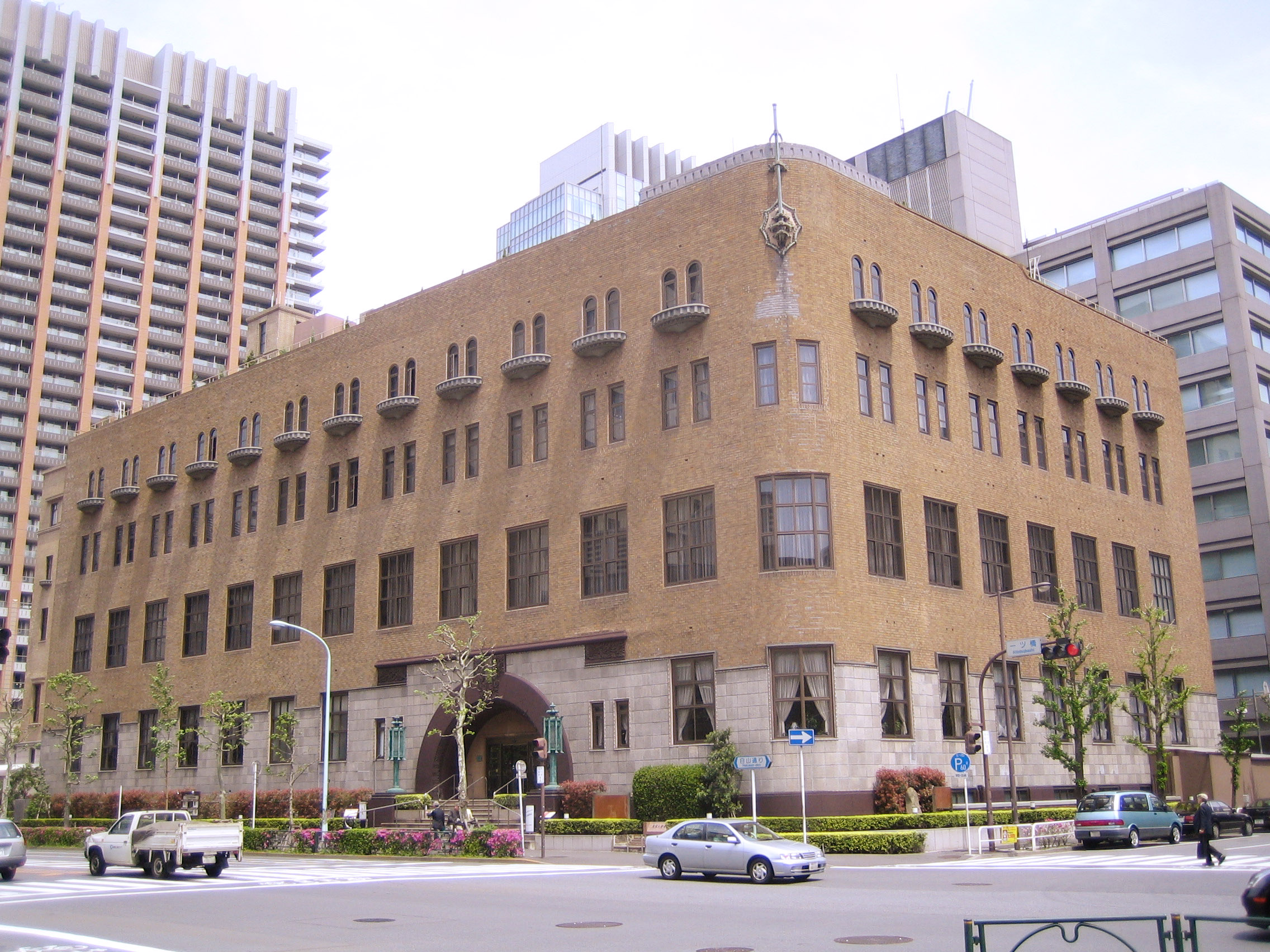
Gakushi Kaikan

Nishikichō (錦町), officially Kanda-Nishikichō (神田錦町), is a district of Chiyoda, Tokyo, Japan, consisting of 1-chōme to 3-chōme. As of April 1, 2007, its population is 673.

This district is located on the northern part of Chiyoda. It borders Kanda-Ogawamachi and Kanda-Jinbōchō to the north, Uchi-Kanda and Kanda-Mitoshirochō to the east, Ōtemachi to the south, and Hitotsubashi to the west. The Nihonbashi River forms its southern boundary.

Nishikichō is home to several educational and academic institutions such as Tokyo Denki University, Gakushi Kaikan, Kinjyo Gakuen High School and Seisoku Gakuen High School.

== Economy ==
MCDecaux has its headquarters in the Nishimoto Kosan Nishikicho Building (西本興産錦町ビル Nishimoto Kōsan Nishikichō Biru) in Nishikichō.

== Education ==
Chiyoda Board of Education operates public elementary and junior high schools. Ochanomizu Elementary School (お茶の水小学校) is the zoned elementary school for Nishikichō 1-3 chōme. There is a freedom of choice system for junior high schools in Chiyoda Ward, and so there are no specific junior high school zones.
