= Kanda-Sudachō, Tokyo =

District of Chiyoda, Tokyo, Japan

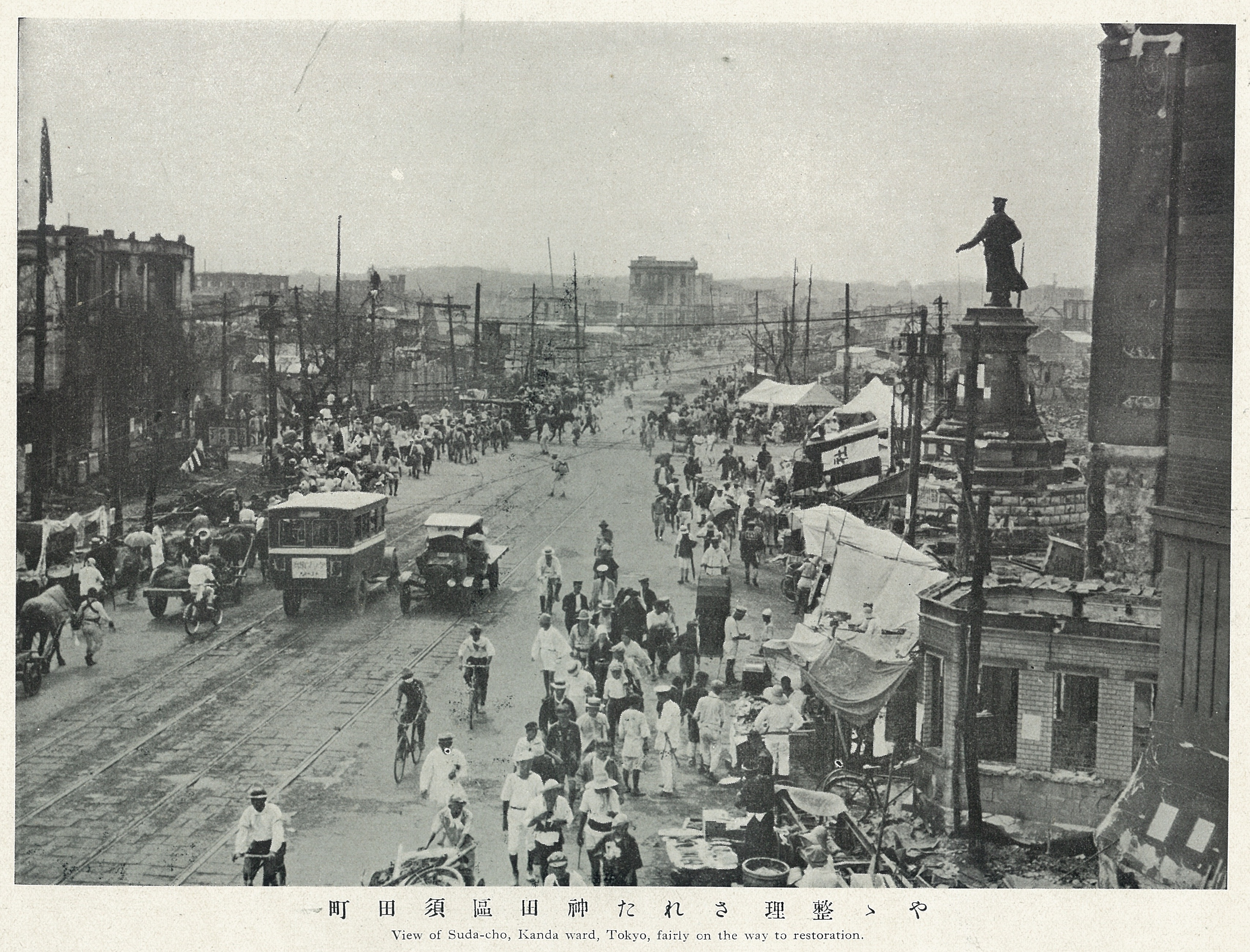
Historical Kanda-Sudachō photo from after the 1923 Great Kantō earthquake

Sudachō (須田町), officially Kanda-Sudachō (神田須田町), is a district of Chiyoda, Tokyo, Japan, consisting of 1-chōme and 2-chōme. As of April 1, 2007, its population is 1,019.

This district is located on the northeastern part of Chiyoda Ward. It borders (across Kanda River) Soto-Kanda and Kanda-Sakumachō on the north, Kanda-Iwamotochō on the east, Kanda-Kajichō and Kajichō on the south, and Kanda-Awajichō, Kanda-Ogawamachi and Kanda-Tachō on the west.

Sudachō once had a terminal which served for a number of the Tokyo City Streetcar lines. It is one of the few areas that survived the bombing of Tokyo in World War II, resulting in many historic buildings still existing.

At one time Creatures Inc. had its headquarters in the Nintendo Kanda Building (任天堂神田ビル, Nintendō Kanda Biru) in Sudachō.

== Education ==
Chiyoda Board of Education operates public elementary and junior high schools. Chiyoda Elementary School (千代田小学校) is the zoned elementary school for Kanda-Sudachō 2-chōme and the following ban of 1-chōme: 7, 16, 18, 20, 22, 24, 26, 28, 30, 32, and 34. Shōhei Elementary School (昌平小学校) is the zoned elementary school for the following ban of 1-chōme: 1-6, 8-15, 17, 19, 21, 23, and 25. There is a freedom of choice system for junior high schools in Chiyoda Ward, and so there are no specific junior high school zones.
