= Ogawamachi =

Ogawamachi (小川町) may refer to:

- Ogawamachi, Tokyo, a district in Chiyoda, Tokyo, Japan
  - Ogawamachi Station (Tokyo), a train station in Ogawamachi district
- Ogawa, Saitama, a town in Saitama Prefecture, Japan
  - Ogawamachi Station (Saitama), a railway station in Ogawa town
  - 14315 Ogawamachi, a minor planet named for the town in Saitama Prefecture
