= Tomiyamachō, Tokyo =

District of Chiyoda, Tokyo, Japan

Tomiyamachō (富山町), officially Kanda-Tomiyamachō (神田富山町), is a district of Chiyoda, Tokyo, Japan. As of April 1, 2007, its population is 75. Its postal code is 101–0043.

This district is located on the northeastern part of Chiyoda Ward. It borders Kanda-Higashimatsushitachō on the north and east, Kanda-Konyachō on the south, and Kajichō on the west.

Tomiyamachō is a commercial district near Kanda Station.

== Education ==
Chiyoda Board of Education operates public elementary and junior high schools. Chiyoda Elementary School (千代田小学校) is the zoned elementary school for Kanda-Tomiyamachō. There is a freedom of choice system for junior high schools in Chiyoda Ward, and so there are no specific junior high school zones.
