= Kanda-Sarugakuchō =

District of Chiyoda, Tokyo, Japan

Coordinates: 35°42′01″N 139°45′31″E

Kanda-Sarugakuchō (神田猿楽町) is a district of Chiyoda, Tokyo, Japan, consisting of 1-chōme and 2-chōme. As of March 1, 2007, its population is 656. Note that the Shibuya ward also has a district with the same name.

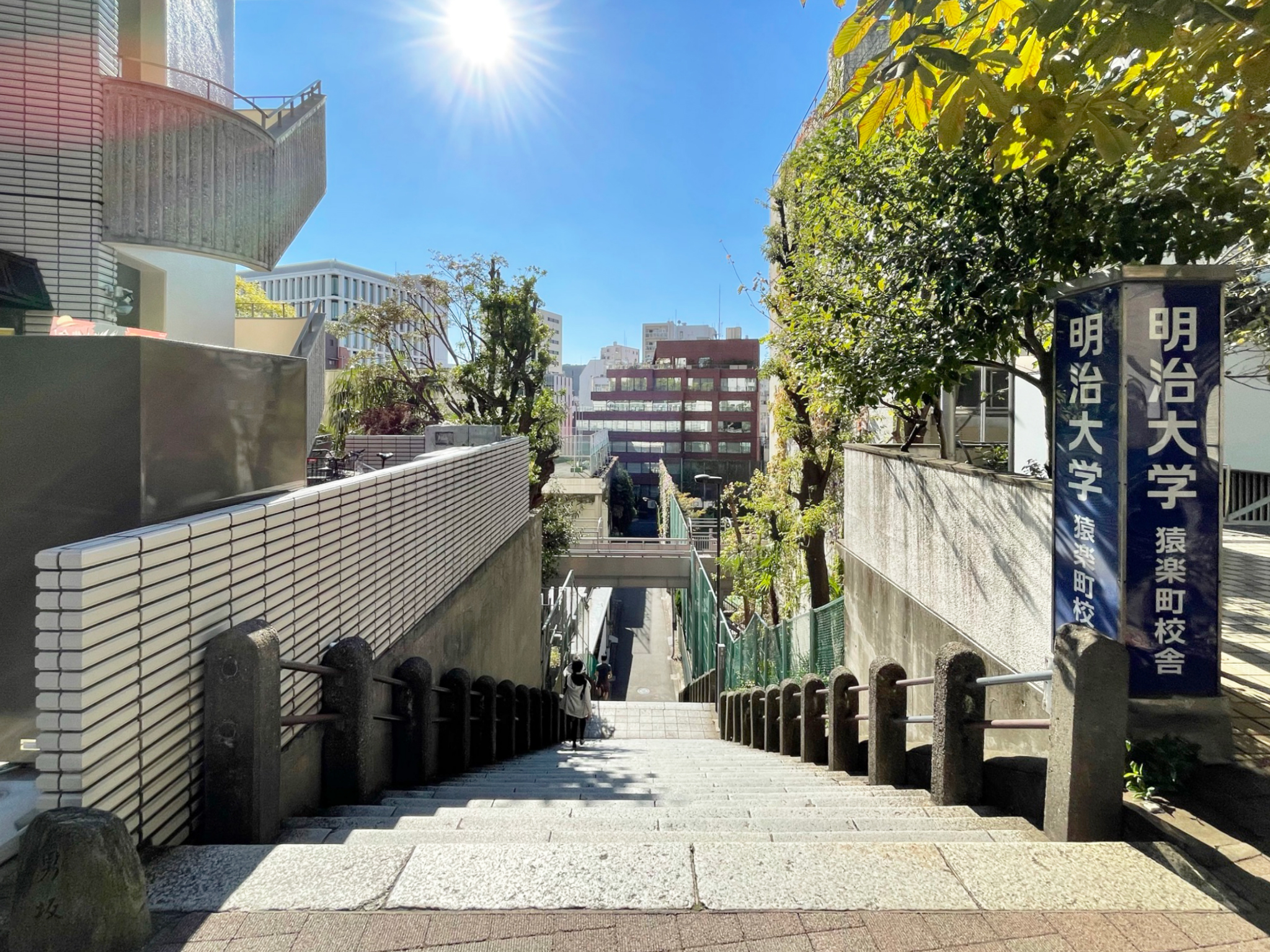
OTOKO-ZAKA or "Manly Slope", Kanda-Sarugakuchō 1-6-3

Kanda-Sarugakuchō is located on the north part of Chiyoda. It borders Kanda-Surugadai to the north and east, Kanda-Ogawamachi to the south, Kanda-Misakichō, and Nishi-Kanda and Kanda-Jinbōchō to the west. The Kinka-dōri Ave forms its western boundary.

A commercial district, Kanda-Sarugakuchō is also home to several educational institutions.

The district has been renamed Kanda-Sarugakuchō, which had been used before the enforcement of the addressing system modernization.

== Education ==
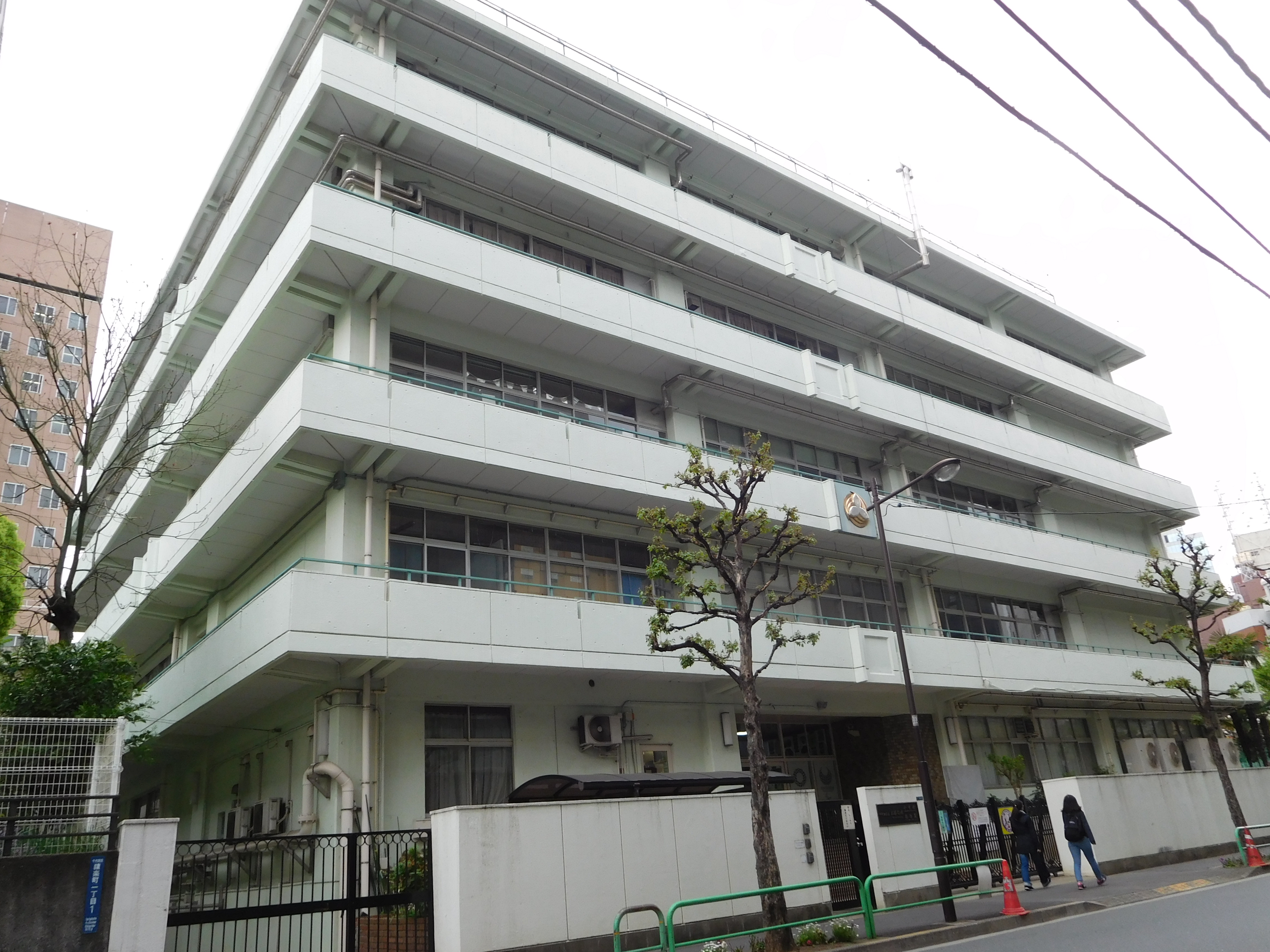
Ochanomizu Elementary School (お茶の水小学校)

Chiyoda Board of Education operates public elementary and junior high schools. Ochanomizu Elementary School (お茶の水小学校) is the zoned elementary school for Kanda-Sarugakuchō 1-2 chōme. Ochanomizu Elementary was created in 1993 as the merger of Kinka Elementary School (錦華小学校), Nishikanda Elementary School (西神田小学), and Ogawa Elementary School (小川小学校). The Kinka building became the Ochanomizu Elementary building.

There is a freedom of choice system for junior high schools in Chiyoda Ward, and so there are no specific junior high school zones.

Institutions within Kanda-Sarugakuchō include:

- Meiji University The 10th and 14th Buildings
- Meiji University Meiji High School & Junior High School
- Kanda Jogakuen Junior & Senior High School
