= Nishi-Kanda =

District of Chiyoda, Tokyo, Japan

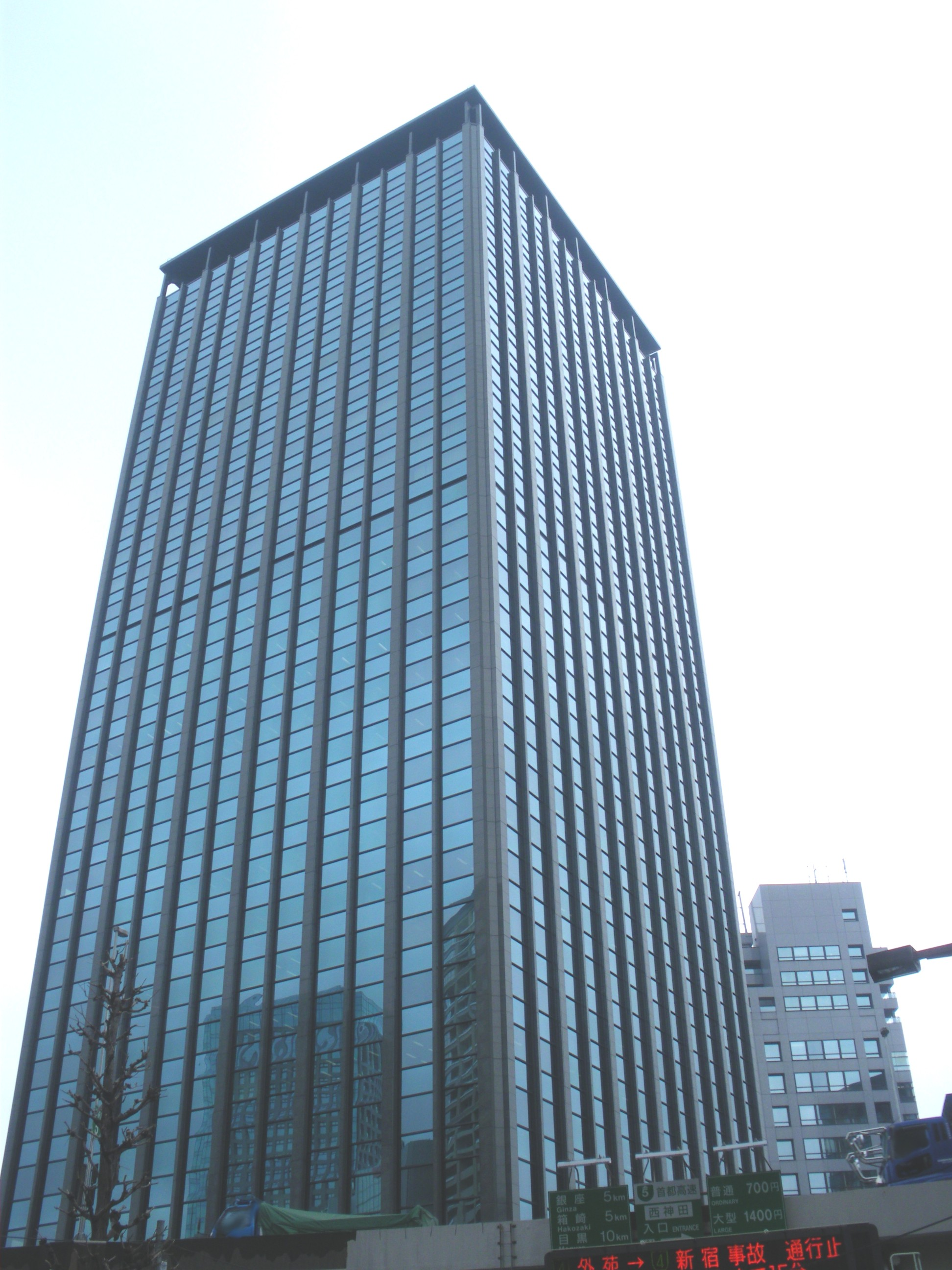
Chiyoda first building west 2009

Nishi-Kanda (西神田) is a district of Chiyoda, Tokyo, Japan, consisting of 1-chōme to 3-chōme. As of April 1, 2007, its population is 1,044.

This district is located on the northern part of Chiyoda Ward. It borders Kanda-Misakichō to the north, (across Kinda-dōri Ave) Kanda-Sarugakuchō to the east, Kanda-Jinbōchō to the south, and (across the Nihonbashi River) Kudankita and Iidabashi to the west.

== District ==
=== Nishi-Kanda 1-chōme ===
- Nihon University College of Economics (2nd, 3rd and 5th Building)
- Kanda Catholic Church

=== Nishi-Kanda 2-chōme ===
- Nihon University College of Law (7th and 9th Building, Library)
- Nihon University Correspondence Division (1st Building)

=== Nishi-Kanda 3-chōme ===
- Asahi Press

== Education ==
Chiyoda Board of Education operates public elementary and junior high schools. Ochanomizu Elementary School (お茶の水小学校) is the zoned elementary school for Nishi-Kanda 1-3 chōme. There is a freedom of choice system for junior high schools in Chiyoda Ward, and so there are no specific junior high school zones.

Nihon University College of Economics 2nd, 3rd and 5th Buildings are in Nishi-Kanda, as are Nihon University College of Law 7th and 9th Buildings and Library.
