= Kitanorimonochō, Tokyo =

District of Chiyoda, Tokyo, Japan

Coordinates: 35°41′33″N 139°46′26″E

Kitanorimonochō (北乗物町), or officially Kanda-Kitanorimonochō (神田北乗物町), is a district of Chiyoda, Tokyo, Japan. As of April 1, 2007, its population is 90. Its postal code is 101-0036.

This district is located in the northeast part of the Chiyoda ward. It borders Kanda-Konyachō (North) to the north, Kanda-Higashikonyachō and Kanda-Higashimatsushitachō to the east, Kanda-Konyachō (South) to the south, and Kajichō to the west.

== Education ==
Chiyoda Board of Education operates public elementary and junior high schools. Chiyoda Elementary School (千代田小学校) is the zoned elementary school for Kanda-Kitanorimonochō. There is a freedom of choice system for junior high schools in Chiyoda Ward, and so there are no specific junior high school zones.
