= Kanda-Tachō, Tokyo =

District of Chiyoda, Tokyo, Japan

Tachō (多町), officially Kanda-Tachō (神田多町), is a district of Chiyoda, Tokyo, Japan. Currently it consists of only 2-chōme. As of April 1, 2007, its population is 498. Its postal code is 101-0046.

This district is located on the northern part of Chiyoda Ward. It borders Kanda-Sudachō on the north, Kanda-Sudachō and Kanda-Kajichō on the east, (across Kanda-Keisatsu-dōri Avenue) Uchi-Kanda on the south, and Kanda-Tsukasamachi on the west.

A commercial neighborhood, this district is home to the head office of Hayakawa Publishing, Japan's largest science fiction publisher.

== Education ==
Chiyoda Board of Education operates public elementary and junior high schools. Chiyoda Elementary School (千代田小学校) is the zoned elementary school for Kanda-Tachō 2-chōme. There is a freedom of choice system for junior high schools in Chiyoda Ward, and so there are no specific junior high school zones.
