= Sugatsune =

Japanese industrial parts manufacturing company

Sugatsune Kogyo Co. Ltd.
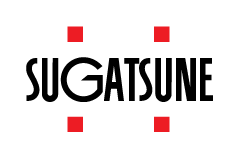
- Native name: スガツネ工業株式会社
- Romanized name: Sugatsune Kōgyō Kabushiki-gaisha
- Company type: KK
- Industry: Manufacturing
- Incorporated: November 20, 1943
- Founded: February 11, 1930; 96 years ago in Tokyo
- Headquarters: Iwamotochō, Chiyoda, Tokyo, Japan
- Areas served: Canada; China; India; Japan; United Kingdom; United States; Germany; Italy; Spain; France; South Korea
- Key people: Jun Sugasawara, President
- Products: Architectural and industrial hardware components
- Total equity: ¥400,000,000 (2024)
- Number of employees: 497 (2024)
- Website: global.sugatsune.com

Sugatsune Kogyo (スガツネ工業株式会社, Sugatsune Kōgyō Kabushiki-gaisha) is a manufacturing company based in Tokyo. The company name "Sugatsune" is a shortened form of the founder's name, Sugasawara Tsunesaburo. It was founded as Sugatsune Shouten in Kanda, Tokyo in 1930.

Sugatsune is a source for hardware products and component hardware for homes, telecommunication devices, consumer electronics, and marine equipment. Several Sugatsune products have won the Good Design Award (グッドデザイン賞) in Japan, administered by the Ministry of International Trade and Industry.

Sugatsune is known for its motion-focused engineering, with proprietary technologies such as Motion Design Tec (MDT), and for its original brand, LAMP. The company operates globally, with 7 subsidiaries across North America, Europe, and Asia. Its corporate slogan is “Because Details Matter.”

Sugatsune is headquartered in Iwamotochō, Tokyo and the company has sales and distribution offices in the United States, Canada, the United Kingdom, Germany, China, India, and South Korea.

== Founding ==
After the company was incorporated in 1930, it changed its name to Sugatsune Kogyo Co, Ltd., and started manufacturing telecommunication hardware components until the end of World War II. Thereafter, the company started producing architectural and furniture hardware. Sugatsune first hardware was exported to the U.S. in 1949.

== History ==
=== 1930s–1940s ===
Sugatsune was founded in 1930 by Tsunesaburo Sugasawara as Sugatsune Shoten, a hardware store in Kanda, Tokyo, specialising in European-style furniture hardware. In 1943, it was incorporated as Sugatsune Kogyo Co., Ltd. and shifted to manufacturing metal components for telecommunications. In 1949, the company began producing furniture and architectural hardware and started exporting hardware products to the United States.

=== 1950s–1960s ===
Sugatsune gained national recognition when it supplied custom fittings for the 1955 wedding of the Crown Prince (later Emperor Akihito). In 1969, it opened a mass production facility in Chiba Prefecture, marking a shift to in-house manufacturing and product development.

=== 1970s ===
The company's first self-developed slide hinge entered mass production in 1976. In 1972, it secured an international patent for a one-touch door holder. Leadership transitioned to Hiroshi Sugasawara in 1973. A new office was opened in Osaka in 1975.

=== 1980s ===
In 1982, Sugatsune established its first international subsidiary, Sugatsune America, Inc., in California, and built its first large logistics centre in Chiba. In 1987, the company introduced Lapcon, a proprietary damper mechanism that laid the foundation for future motion technologies. The first Lapcon product, Tallman, launched in 1988, was followed by the SDS Soft-Down Stay in 1989—a compact flap stay featuring integrated soft-close damping, which would go on to define the Lapcon brand.

The decade also saw the debut of the HES concealed hinge series in 1989 with the HES-3030BR, marking the beginning of Sugatsune's advancement in concealed hinge technology.

=== 1990s ===
In 1992, the HES-3030AK was introduced—one of the world's first concealed hinges with post-installation adjustability.

The 1990s marked significant expansion in both infrastructure and global recognition. A second logistics centre opened in 1992, and that same year, Sugatsune's president was awarded the Medal with Blue Ribbon (a national honour in Japan given for significant achievements in public service or industry). In 1998, the company obtained ISO 9001 certification and established a technical centre in Chiba. Leadership transitioned to Michio Sugasawara in 1999.

=== 2000s ===
In 2006, the HES3D-190 was released with 3-way adjustment post installation and a temporary holding feature.

Sugatsune expanded further across Japan and abroad. It established Sugatsune UK in 2005 and Sugatsune Shanghai. In 2006, Jun Sugasawara became president. In 2009, the company formally introduced the concept of Motion Design Tec (MDT), marking a new era in movement-based product design.

=== 2010s ===
The LIN-X1000 lateral opening hinge won the Good Design Award (2016) and Red Dot Award (2017). In 2011, the HES3D-160, a 3-way adjustable concealed hinge, won a Good Design Award. Sugatsune established branches in Germany, India, and Canada, and expanded its global showroom presence. A second logistics facility was added in Osaka. In 2015, Sugatsune India was founded. That same year, the company celebrated its 85th anniversary.

=== 2020s ===
In 2022, the HES2S-140-A125 was introduced as the world's first surface-mount concealed hinge for swing doors, allowing simplified installation without deep mortising.

That same year also marked the release of the HES1F-140, a concealed hinge designed specifically for ultra-thin door frames, enabling flush-to-wall door designs.

Sugatsune marked its 90th anniversary in 2020. In 2022, Sugatsune Korea Co., Ltd. was established. In 2023, the company opened its Kanamono Dori Annex showroom in Tokyo. The MFU1200 flush sliding door system and HES1F/HES2S concealed hinges received iF Design Awards.

== Products ==
Sugatsune's product range includes over 20,000 items. The items range from architectural furniture and hardware to industrial components. This includes hinges, hooks, catches, drawer slides, brackets, handles and more. It produces products for a variety of industries as diverse as cabinets, semiconductor fabrication plants, yachts, doors, and more.

Sugatsune's hinges are used around the world and are recognized in the industry.

== Design Awards ==
Sugatsune has received numerous international design awards for its innovative hardware products. The company's focus on motion design and functional aesthetics has been recognized by major design organizations worldwide.

=== Recent Awards (2020s) ===
Award	Year	Product
iF Design Award	2023	MFU1200 Flush Sliding Door System
iF Design Award	2023	HES1F-140 Slim Frame Hinge
iF Design Award	2023	HES2S-140-A125 Surface-Mount Concealed Hinge
Good Design Award (Best 100)	2022	HES1F-140 Slim Frame Hinge
Good Design Award	2022	FD Series Top-Mounted Sliding Door System (FD25SP, FD30EX, FD35EV)
Kids Design Award	2022	HES1F-140 Slim Frame Hinge
Kids Design Award	2022	FD Series Top-Mounted Sliding Door System
Kids Design Award	2022	HOOK Series (Nordic Rubber, Silicone Rubber, Mini Flowers)
Good Design Award	2021	HG-TLAJ / HG-TAWJ Spring-Assist Torque Hinges
interzum Award for High Product Quality	2021	AZ-AT Touchless Multi-Purpose Lid
interzum Award for High Product Quality	2021	EXCELOCK Contactless Lock System

=== 2010s Awards ===
Award	Year	Product
Red Dot Award	2019	LDD-V100 Hidden Door Damper
Red Dot Award	2017	LIN-X1000 Lateral Opening Hinge
Good Design Award	2016	LIN-X1000 Lateral Opening Hinge
Good Design Award	2014	OLYMPIA 360 Concealed Hinge
Good Design Award	2014	LAD Lift Assist Damper
Good Design Award	2014	J95 Heavy Duty Concealed Hinge
Good Design Award	2013	Excelock Lock Unit
Good Design Award	2013	DC Damper
Good Design Award	2013	PLN50 Caster
Good Design Award	2011	HES3D-160 3-Way Adjustable Concealed Hinge
Good Design Award	2011	LDD-S Door Damper
Good Design Award	2011	LDD-V Door Damper
Good Design Award	2011	SLS-ELAN Easy Lift-up Stay / EZS-ELAN Lift-assist Stay

=== Legacy Awards (1980s-1990s) ===
Award	Year	Product
Good Design Award	1989	SDS Soft-Down Stay

Additional Good Design Awards were received throughout the 1980s and 1990s for products including the LAPCON Door Closer, TAT Closet Rod Lift, and other hardware innovations.

== Brands ==
=== LAMP ===
LAMP is Sugatsune's proprietary brand for its self-manufactured products. The brand is characterized by its commitment to craftsmanship, functional design, and innovative mechanisms. LAMP products are known for precise and consistent quality with minimal variation, high durability backed by robust internal testing, and attention to detail, including advanced finishes and design aesthetics.

=== Zwei L ===
Zwei L is Sugatsune’s flagship hardware line, separate from its LAMP brand. Made from corrosion-resistant SUS316 stainless steel, it features sharp, distortion-free edges, a mirror-polished surface, and a uniform satin finish. The name derives from the concept of “two lights” (Zwei Lichter) and reflects a focus on precision finishing and material quality.

=== Lapcon Technology ===
==== History ====
Sugatsune introduced Lapcon in the late 1980s as part of its mission to provide movement with elegance and control. The name is a combination of "LAMP", Sugatsune's in-house brand, and "Control," reflecting its purpose in creating refined, controlled motion.

With the launch of Lapcon, Sugatsune became a pioneer in proposing the concept of "designing motion" and enhancing the luxury feel of movement in hardware. The first Lapcon product, Tallman, debuted in 1988, followed by the 1989 release of the SDS Soft-Down Stay, which became a global success and helped Lapcon gain significant recognition in the European kitchen hardware market.

Originally centered around Soft Motion, Lapcon laid the groundwork for a wider range of motion concepts that evolved into what is now known as Motion Design Tec.

=== Motion Design Tec ===
Motion Design Tec (MDT) is Sugatsune's proprietary framework for designing smooth, intuitive, and purposeful movement in architectural and industrial components. Building on the foundations of Lapcon, MDT encompasses six distinct motion types:

Motion Type	Description
Soft Motion	Quiet, controlled movement for lids, doors, and drawers
Free-Stop Motion	Holds a flap or lid at any angle
Assist Motion	Reduces effort to lift or open heavy components
Detent (Click) Motion	Holds at specific angles with tactile feedback
Unique Motion	Enables nontraditional door movements
Multi-Linear Motion	Allows smooth guidance under multidirectional load

==== Representative Products ====
===== Architectural and Furniture Hardware =====
Product	Description
SDS Soft-Down Stay	Compact flap stay with soft-close damping; incorporates Soft Motion
OLYMPIA 360 Concealed Cup Hinges	Compact, high-performance cup hinges for furniture; incorporates Soft Motion and Unique Motion
MFU1200 Flush Sliding Door System	A flush-fitting sliding door that recesses inward and slides laterally; incorporates Soft Motion and Unique Motion
LIN-X Series Lateral Opening Hinge	Enables doors to open parallel to the wall in tight spaces; incorporates Soft Motion and Unique Motion
HES Series Concealed Hinges	3-way adjustable hinges for swing doors with a flush appearance; incorporates Unique Motion

===== Industrial Hardware =====
Product	Description
UDH Torque Damper	Controls movement speed to prevent slamming; incorporates Soft Motion
HG-TQJD Damper Torque Hinge	Torque hinge with smooth deceleration and hold at any angle; incorporates Free-Stop Motion and Soft Motion
HG-TS Torque Hinge	Maintains position without drifting; incorporates Free-Stop Motion
HG-PA Lift-Assist Hinge	Reduces effort to lift heavy lids or panels; incorporates Assist Motion and Soft Motion
S-AT Lift-Assist Stay	Compact stay to support vertical panels or lids; incorporates Assist Motion
HG-CHJ70 Angle-Adjustable Detent Hinge	Holds lid at fixed angles with tactile clicks; incorporates Detent Motion
HG-TAJ40SC20 Two-Axis Spring-Assist Torque Hinge	Provides lift assist and adjustable positioning on two axes; incorporates Free-Stop Motion and Assist Motion
MLGX Linear Guides	Compact linear guide system for multidirectional loads; incorporates Multi-Linear Motion

== Locations ==
=== Japan ===
Sugatsune's headquarters is located in Chiyoda-ku, Tokyo. The company operates several development sites across Japan, including in Tokyo, Kyoto, and at the Motion Design Tec Lab within the Chiba facility. Manufacturing takes place at the Chiba plant, while logistics operations are handled through two distribution centres: SBC (Chiba) and SBW (Osaka). Major sales offices are located in Tokyo, Osaka, Nagoya, Sendai, Fukuoka, Kyoto, Yokohama, Kanagawa, and Takasaki.

=== International ===
==== Sugatsune America, Inc. (LAMPAM) ====
Established in 1982 and headquartered in Los Angeles, with a second location in Chicago.

==== Sugatsune Canada, Inc. ====
Operates out of Montreal to serve the Canadian market.

==== Sugatsune Kogyo (UK) Ltd. ====
Based in Reading and supports customers across the United Kingdom.

==== Sugatsune Europe GmbH ====
Located in Düsseldorf, Germany, handles operations throughout mainland Europe and Turkey. The subsidiary is established in 2016 with a fully equipped showroom and experience center, multi language sales and engineering staff and a +2000m2 warehouse for short delivery times.

==== Sugatsune Shanghai Co., Ltd. ====
Has a main office in Shanghai and a regional office in Guangzhou, supporting customers in China.

==== Sugatsune Kogyo India Pvt. Ltd. ====
Headquartered in Mumbai and has expanded to include offices in Delhi, Chennai, Pune, and Bengaluru.

==== Sugatsune Korea Co., Ltd. ====
Located in Incheon and supports the South Korean market.
