= Uchi-Kanda =

Coordinates: 35.6910°N 139.7650°E

Uchi-Kanda 内神田
- District
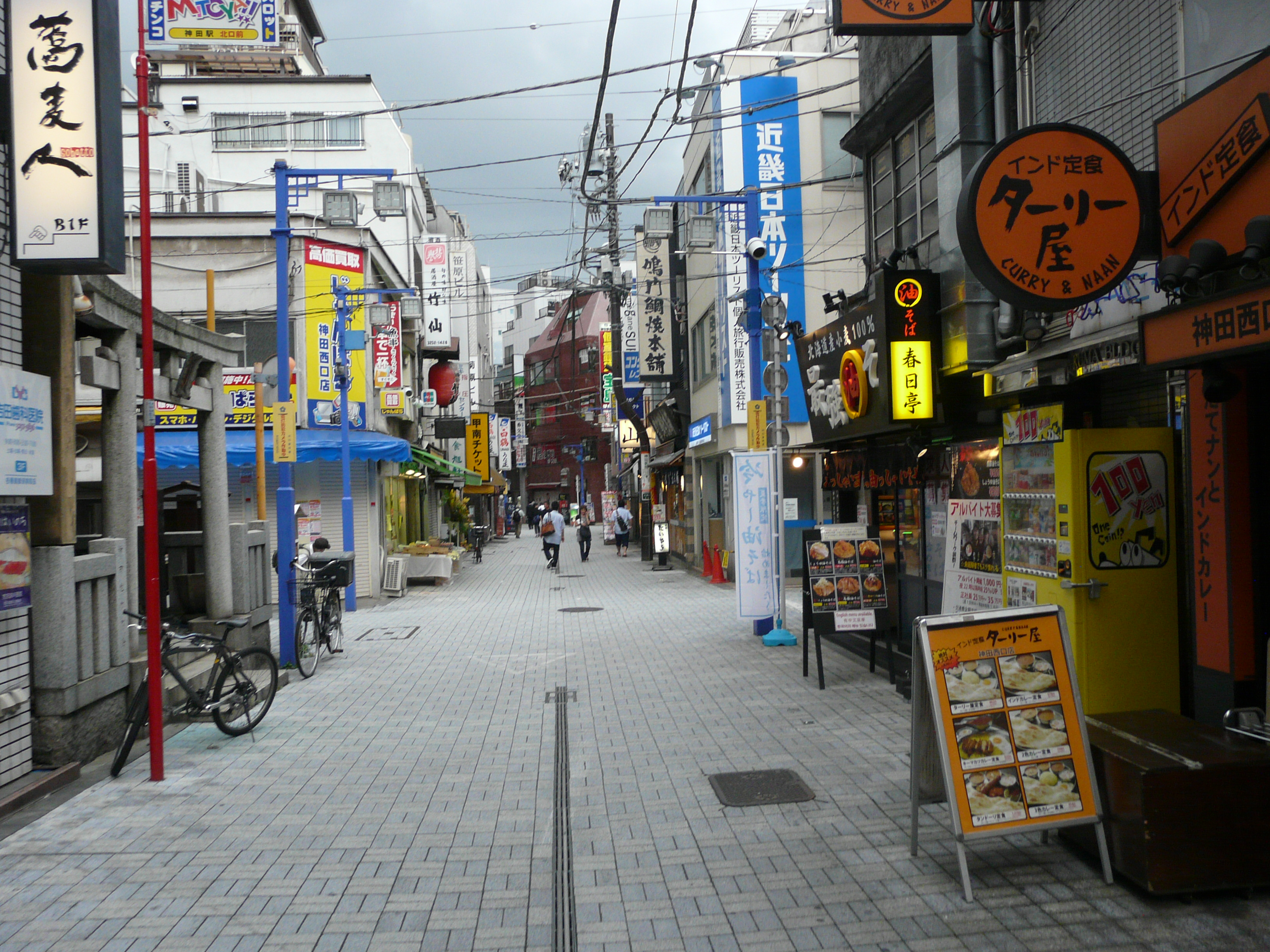
- Ekinishiguchi Street in Uchi-Kanda, looking east. On the left is the Satake Inari Shrine.
- Interactive map of Uchi-Kanda
- Country: Japan
- City: Tokyo
- Ward: Chiyoda

Population (March 1, 2008)
  - Total: 1,277

Uchi-Kanda (内神田) is a district in Chiyoda, Tokyo, Japan. As of March 1, 2008, its population is 1,277.

The Uchi-Kanda district is located in the northern part of Chiyoda, to the west of Kanda Station. It is bordered on the south by the Nihonbashi River and, above the river, the Shuto Expressway, separating the district from Ōtemachi to the south. Its eastern boundary is the elevated railway of the Ueno–Tokyo Line and Yamanote Line, to the east of which lies Kajichō. In the southeast, where the railway and river cross, a small corner of Nihonbashi-Hongokuchō, a district of Chūō, is connected to Uchi-Kanda at street level. Uchi-Kanda also has street-level borders with Kanda-Mitoshirochō, Kanda-Tsukasamachi, Kanda-Tachō and Kanda-Kajichō to the north, and Kanda-Nishikichō to the west.

Today, Uchi-Kanda is a commercial neighborhood with a number of office buildings and stores.

The Japanese division of American Megatrends has its offices in Uchi-Kanda.

== Education ==
Chiyoda Board of Education operates public elementary and junior high schools. Chiyoda Elementary School (千代田小学校) is the zoned elementary school for Uchi-Kanda 1-3 chōme. There is a freedom of choice system for junior high schools in Chiyoda Ward, and so there are no specific junior high school zones.
