= Mitoshirochō, Tokyo =

District of Chiyoda, Tokyo, Japan

Mitoshirochō (美土代町)

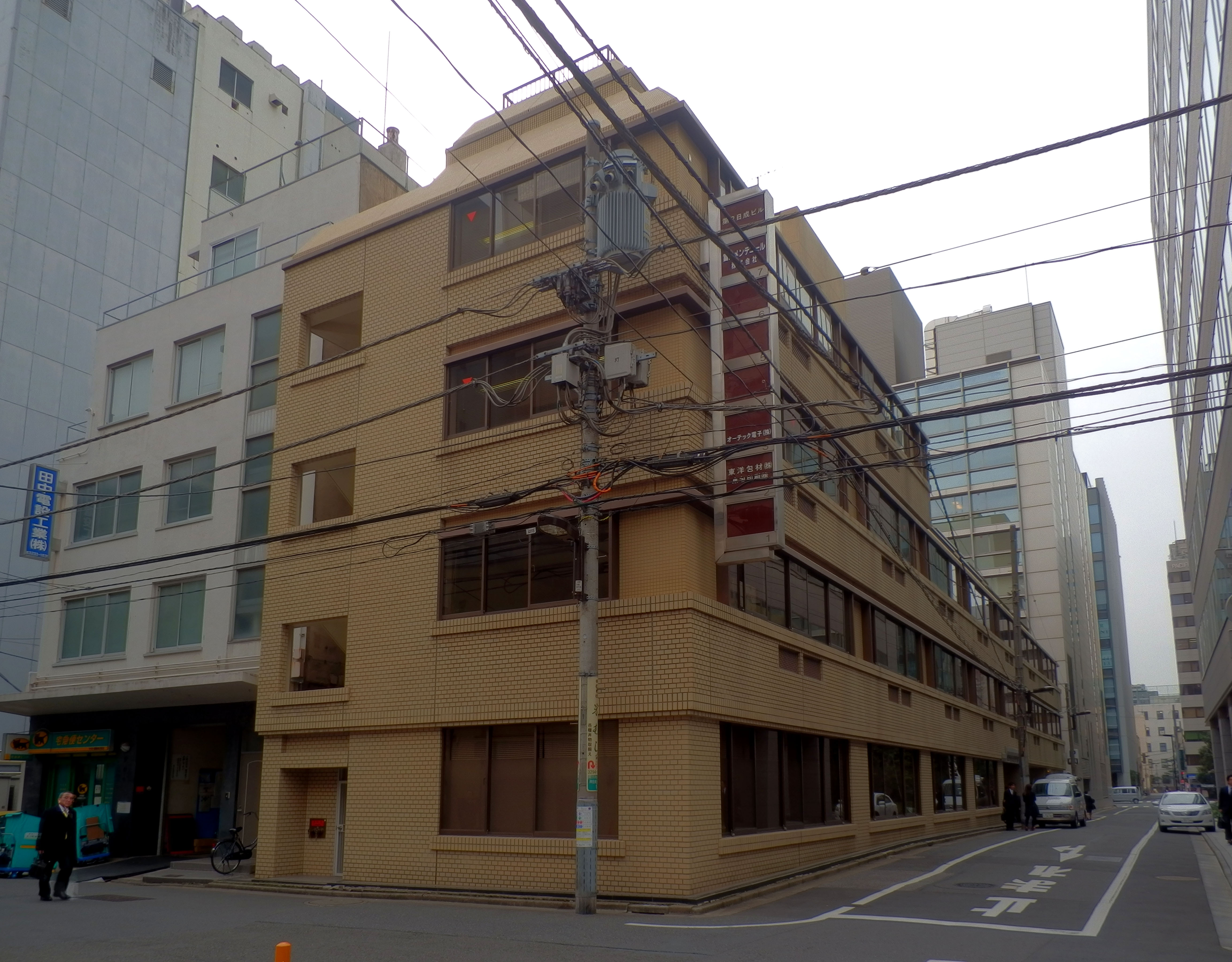

, officially Kanda-Mitoshirochō (神田美土代町), is a district of Chiyoda, Tokyo, Japan. As of April 1, 2007, its population is 35. Its postal code is 101-0053.

This district is located on the northern part of Chiyoda Ward. It borders Kanda-Ogawamachi on the north, Kanda-Tsukasamachi on the east, Uchi-Kanda on the south, and Kanda-Nishikichō on the west.

== Education ==
Chiyoda Board of Education operates public elementary and junior high schools. Chiyoda Elementary School (千代田小学校) is the zoned elementary school for Mitoshirochō. There is a freedom of choice system for junior high schools in Chiyoda Ward, and so there are no specific junior high school zones.
