= Kanda-Misakichō =

District of Chiyoda, Tokyo, Japan

Kanda-Misakichō (神田三崎町) is a district of Chiyoda, Tokyo, Japan, consisting three chōme. Its population was 833 as of April 1, 2007. Its postal code is 101–0061.

Kanda-Misakichō is located on the northern part of Chiyoda Ward. It borders Kōraku and Hongō, Bunkyō to the north; Kanda-Sarugakuchō, Chiyoda to the east; Nishi-Kanda, Chiyoda to the south; and Iidabashi, Chiyoda to the west.

== Economy ==
Holp Shuppan is headquartered in Misakichō.

== Education ==
=== Primary and secondary education ===
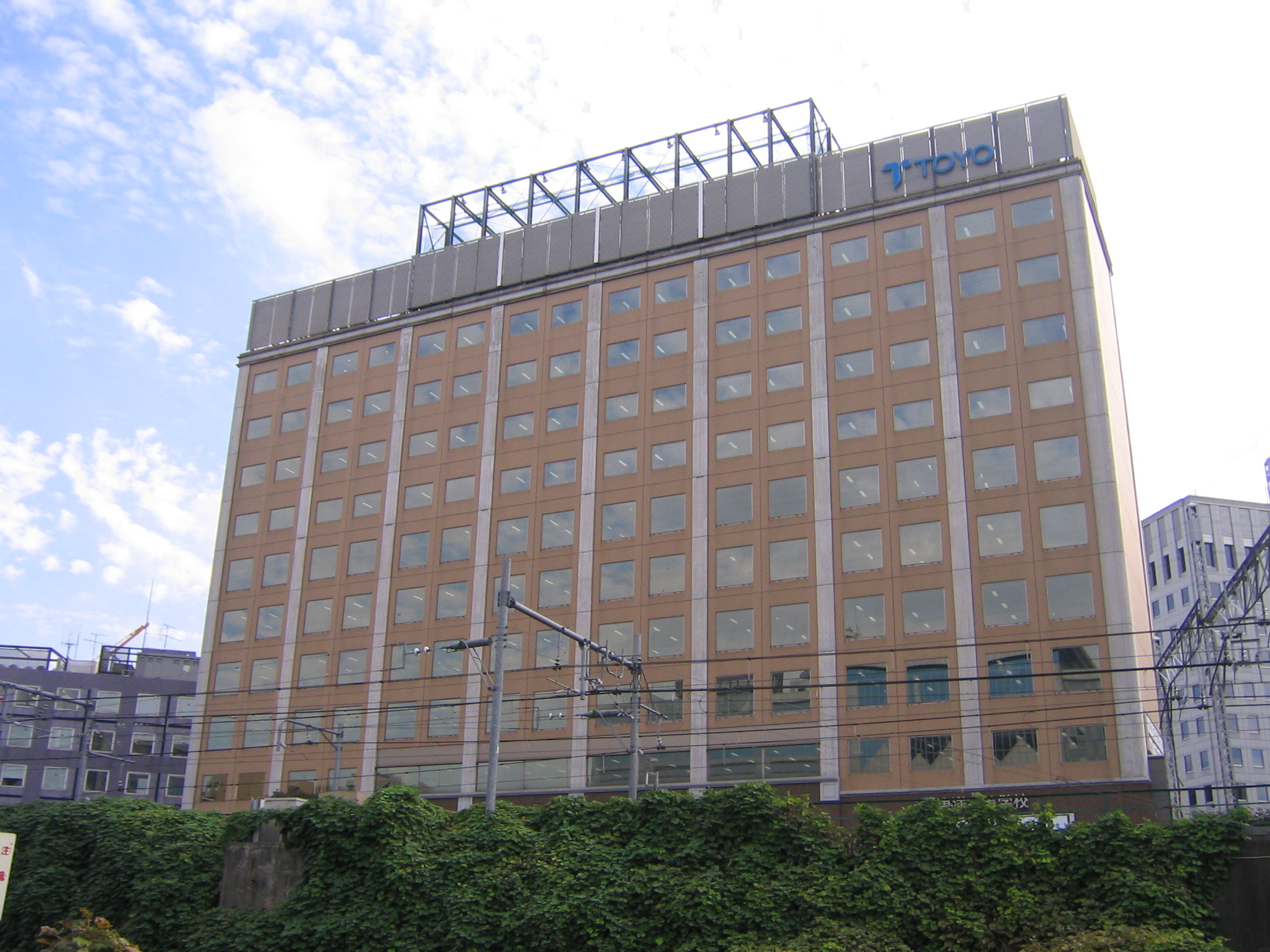
Tōyō High School

Chiyoda Board of Education operates public elementary and junior high schools. Ochanomizu Elementary School (お茶の水小学校) is the zoned elementary school for Kanda-Misakichō 1-3 chōme. There is a freedom of choice system for junior high schools in Chiyoda Ward, and so there are no specific junior high school zones.

Tōyō High School, a private high school, is in Kanda-Misakichō 1-chōme.

=== Tertiary education ===
Kanda-Misakichō 1-chōme

- Nihon University College of Economics (Main Building)

Kanda-Misakichō 2-chōme

- Nihon University College of Law (Main, 2nd, 3rd, 4th and 5th Building)
- Nihon University College of Economics (7th Building)
- Nihon University Correspondence Division (Main Building)
- Tokyo Dental College
- LEC Tokyo Legal Mind University

Kanda-Misakichō 3-chōme

- RINRI Institute of Ethics
