= Holp Shuppan =

Japanese publishing company

Holp Shuppan, Publishers Co., Ltd. (株式会社ほるぷ出版, Kabushiki Kaisha Horupu Shuppan) is a publishing company headquartered in Misaki-cho, Chiyoda, Tokyo. It is a subsidiary of GAIA Holdings Corporation.

As of 1977, the company has published children's books and sold reference works. The name is an acronym for "Home Library Production". The company had 28 billion yen in turnover in 1975 and 20 billion yen in turnover in 1977.
