= Higashikonyachō, Tokyo =

District of Chiyoda, Tokyo, Japan

Coordinates: 35.693°N 139.775°E

Higashikonyachō (東紺屋町), officially Kanda-Higashikonyachō (神田東紺屋町), is a district of Chiyoda, Tokyo, Japan. As of April 1, 2007, its population is 55. Its postal code is 101–0034.

This district is located on the northeastern part of Chiyoda Ward. It borders Kanda-Higashimatsushitachō on the north, (across Shōwa-dōri Avenue) Iwamotochō on the east, Kanda-Konyachō on the south, and Kanda-Kitanorimonochō and Kanda-Konyachō on the west.

It is a commercial district near the east exit of Kanda Station.

== Education ==
Chiyoda Board of Education operates public elementary and junior high schools. Chiyoda Elementary School (千代田小学校) is the zoned elementary school for Kanda-Higashikonyachō. There is a freedom of choice system for junior high schools in Chiyoda Ward, and so there are no specific junior high school zones.
