= Nihonbashi River =

Coordinates: 35.684057°N 139.774457°E

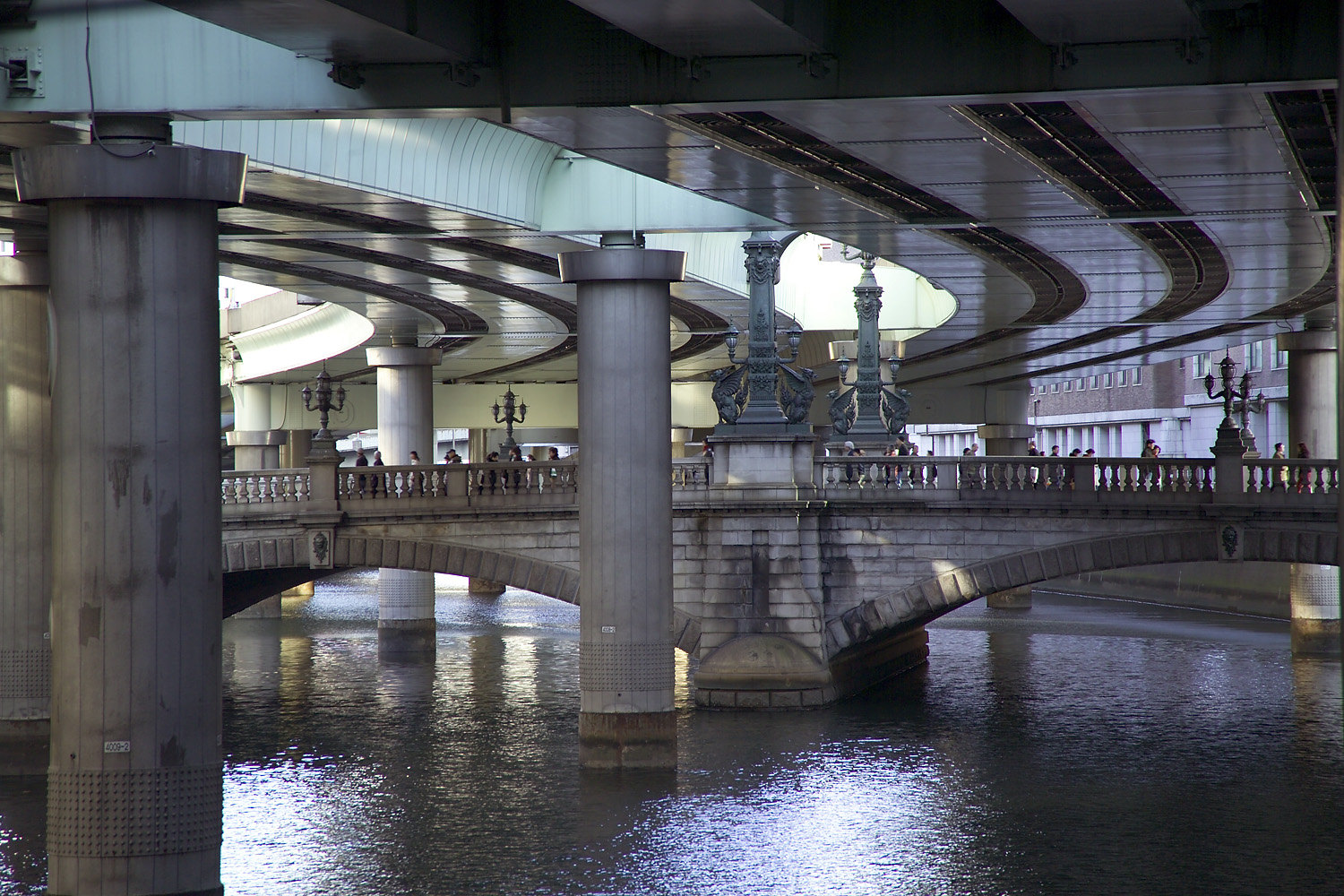
- Nihonbashi River spanned by the Nihonbashi Bridge. The Shuto Expressway pictured overhead.

Location
- Country: Japan

Physical characteristics
- Source
  - location: Kanda River, Bunkyo, Tokyo
- Mouth
  - location: Sumida River, Chuo, Tokyo
- Length: 4.8 km (3.0 mi)

The Nihonbashi River (日本橋川, Nihonbashi-gawa) is a river which flows through central Tokyo, Japan. It is a distributary river of the Kanda River and flows into the Sumida River near the Eitai Bridge.

The river is 4.8 km (3.0 mi) in length and passes through Chiyoda and Chuo wards. The river was created by a re-channeling of the former Hira River in the 15th century at the direction of Ōta Dōkan to form a part of the external fortifications and water management plan for Edo Castle.

Connected to Tokyo Bay the river is shallow in depth and subject to a tidal range of up to two meters. The river banks are heavily built up in character and the Inner Circular Route C1 of the Shuto Expressway has covered almost the entire length of the river since the expressway's construction in 1962. Despite this the river features urban park space along its southern bank, occasional boat tours and a number of noteworthy and historic bridges along its route; foremost being the Nihonbashi Bridge designed by Tsumaki Yorinaka in 1911.
