= Surugadai =

District of Chiyoda, Tokyo

Coordinates: 35°41′57″N 139°45′49″E

Kanda-Surugadai (神田駿河台, Kanda-Surugadai) is a district of Chiyoda, Tokyo, Japan. It was named after Tokugawa Ieyasu's death, when the Edo government allowed officials from Sunpu (now Shizuoka) to live in the area. Kanda-Surugadai is often called Surugadai (駿河台, Surugadai) or, colloquially, Sundai (駿台, Sundai).

The main building and campus of Meiji University is in the district.

The headquarters of the Japanese Trade Union Confederation (Rengo) is located in Kanda-Surugadai.

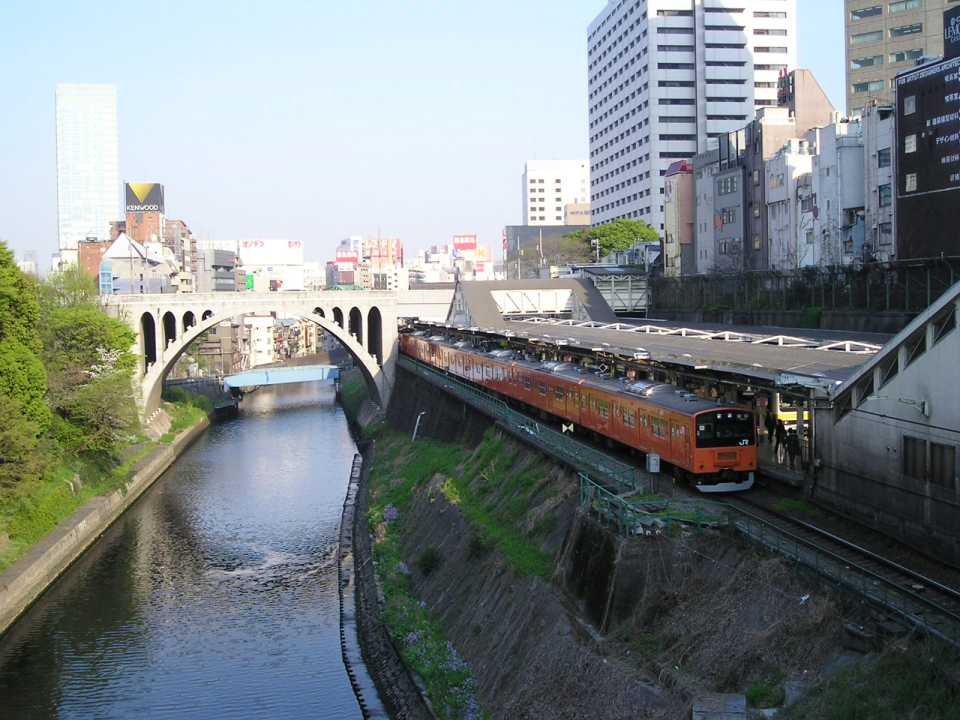
hijiribashi

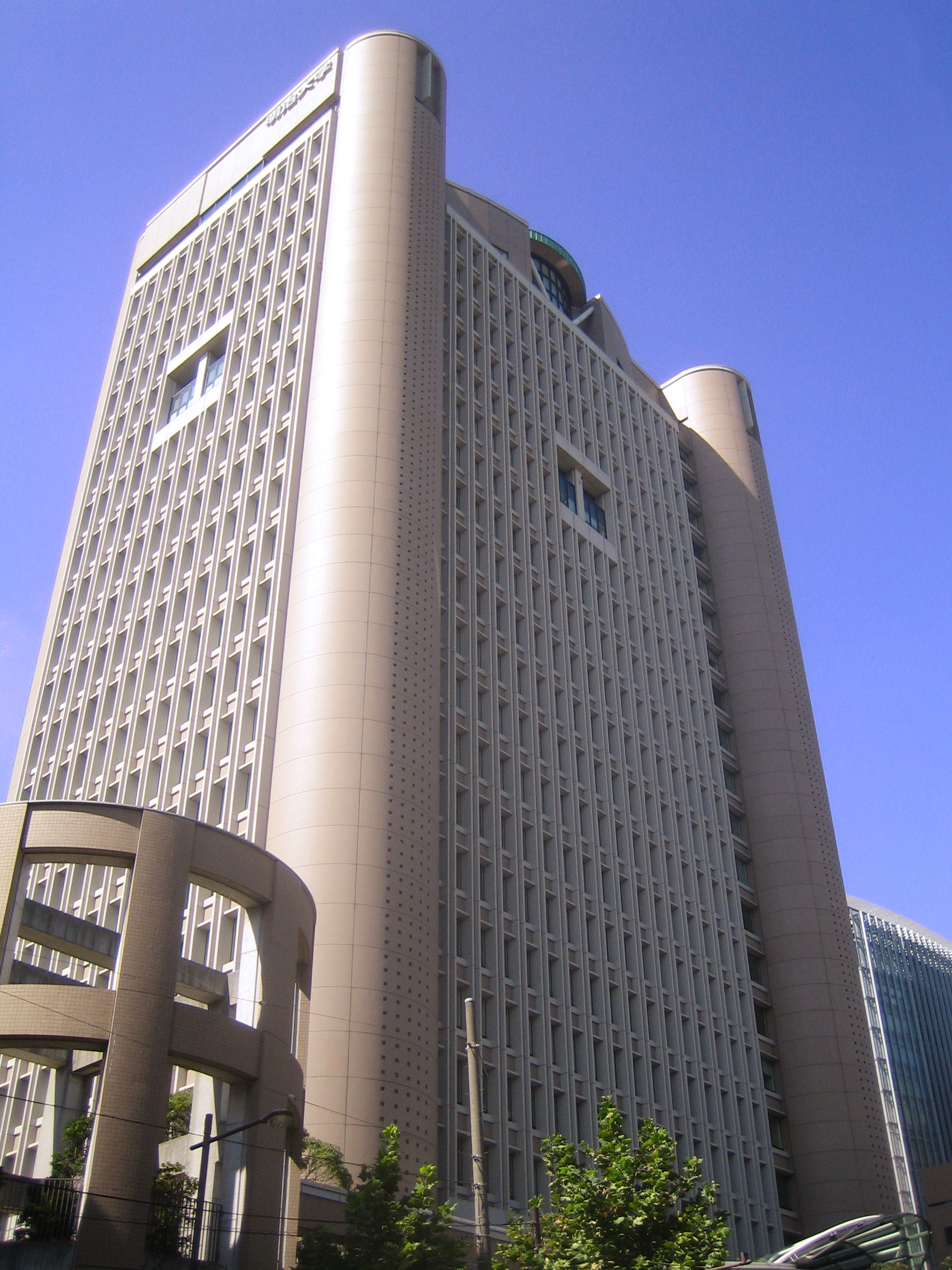
Meiji University (Liberty Tower)

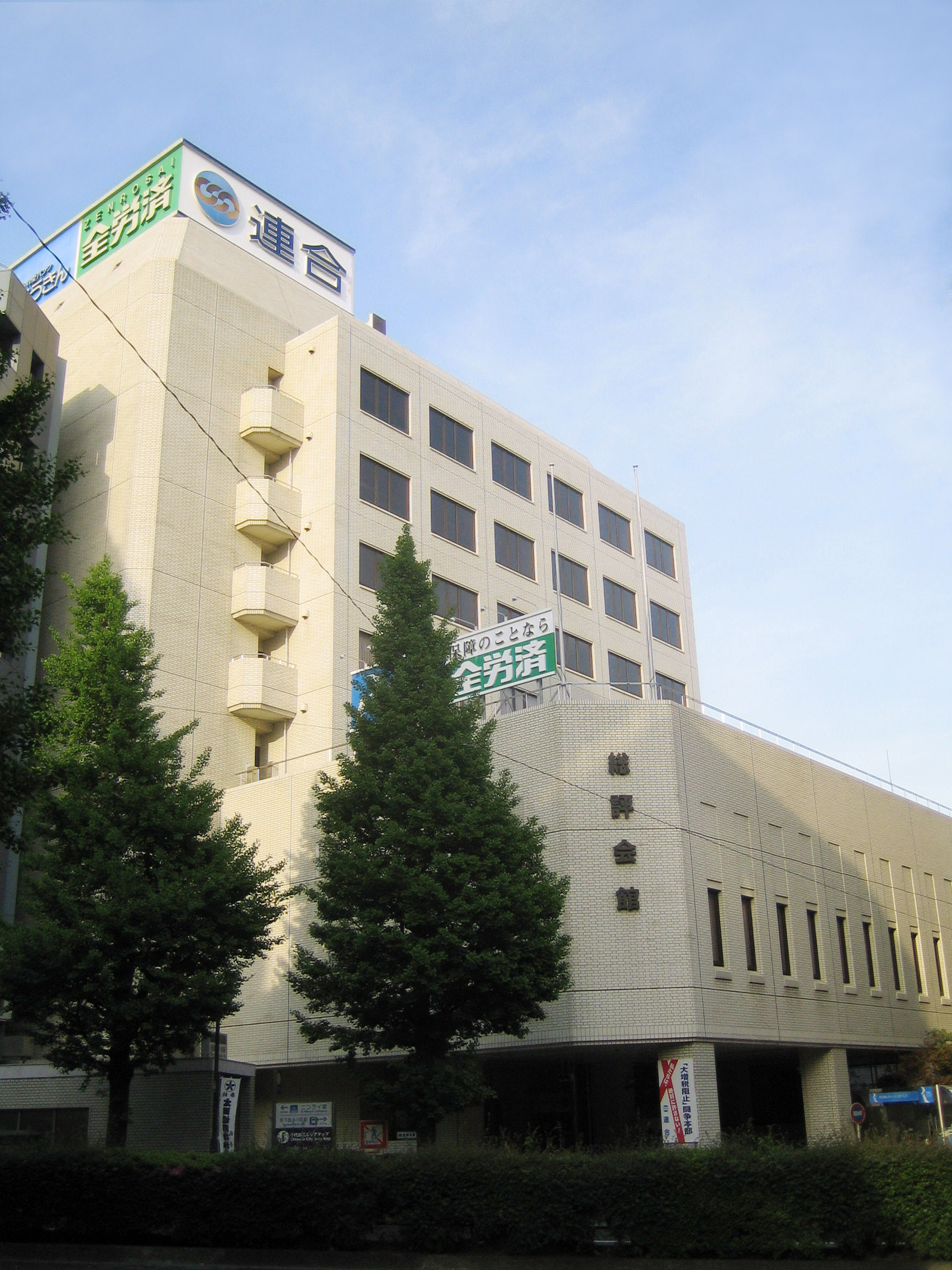
Rengo HQ in Kanda-Surugadai

== Companies based in Surugadai ==
Nippon Paper Industries, the pulp and paper manufacturing company, has its headquarters in the district.

== Education ==
Chiyoda Board of Education operates public elementary and junior high schools. Ochanomizu Elementary School (お茶の水小学校) is the zoned elementary school for Kanda-Surugadai 1-2-chōme, Kanda-Surugadai 3-chōme 1, 3, 5, 7, 8, and 11-ban, and Kanda-Surugadai 4-chōme 1, 3, and 5 ban. Shōhei Elementary School (昌平小学校) is the zoned elementary school for Kanda-Surugadai 3-chōme 2, 4, and 6 ban, and Kanda-Surugadai 4-chōme 2, 4, and 6 ban. There is a freedom of choice system for junior high schools in Chiyoda Ward, and so there are no specific junior high school zones.
