= Konyachō, Chiyoda, Tokyo =

District of Chiyoda, Tokyo, Japan

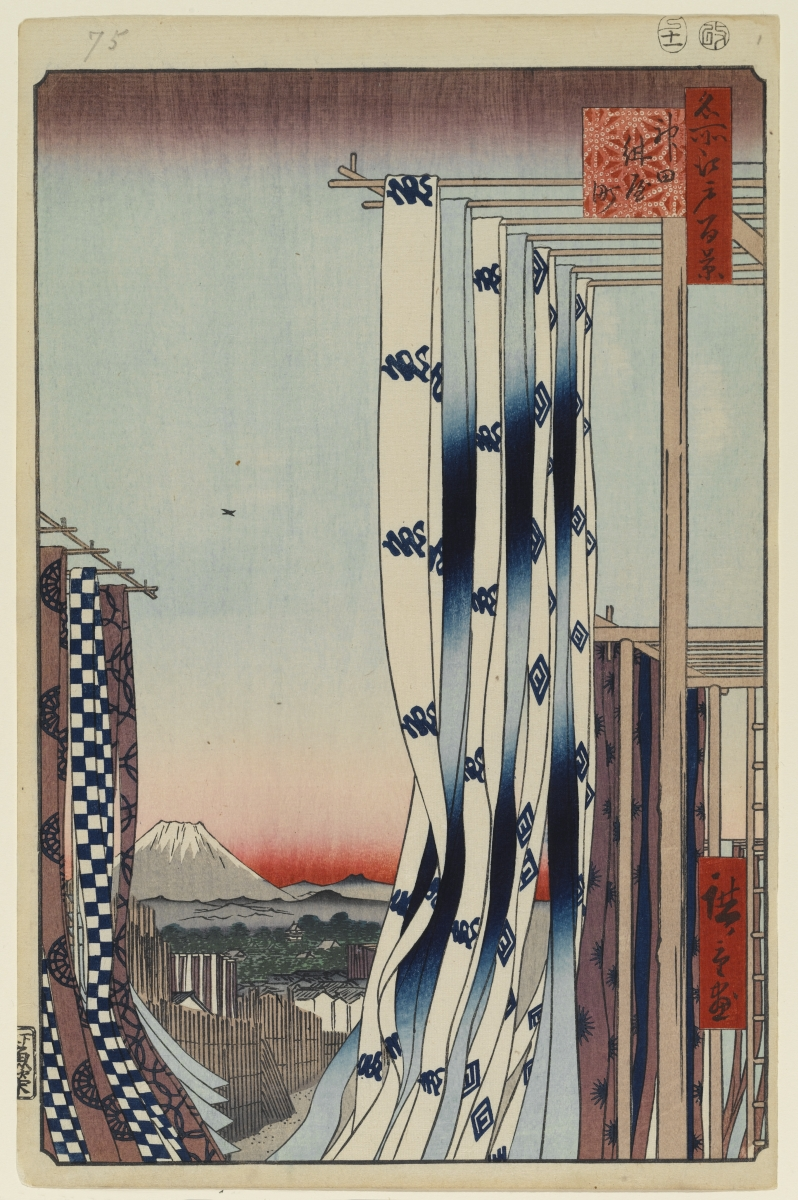
Landscape of the old-time Konyachō, drawn by Utagawa Hiroshige as one of the One Hundred Famous Views of Edo.

Konyachō (紺屋町), formally Kanda-Konyachō (神田紺屋町), is a district of Chiyoda, Tokyo, Japan.

The district is made up of two non-contiguous (northern and southern) neighborhoods split by Kitanorimonochō. Originally, only the southern portion had been called Konyachō. But in 1719, the Edo government ordered a part of Konyachō's residents to move to the north of Kitanorimonochō for disaster prevention. Since then, both portions adjacent to Kitanorimonochō have been called Konyachō.

Today, the district is a business district near Kanda Station.

== Education ==
Chiyoda Board of Education operates public elementary and junior high schools. Chiyoda Elementary School (千代田小学校) is the zoned elementary school for Kanda-Konyachō. There is a freedom of choice system for junior high schools in Chiyoda Ward, and so there are no specific junior high school zones.
