= Ogawamachi, Tokyo =

District of Chiyoda, Tokyo, Japan

Coordinates: 35.6942°N 139.7640°E

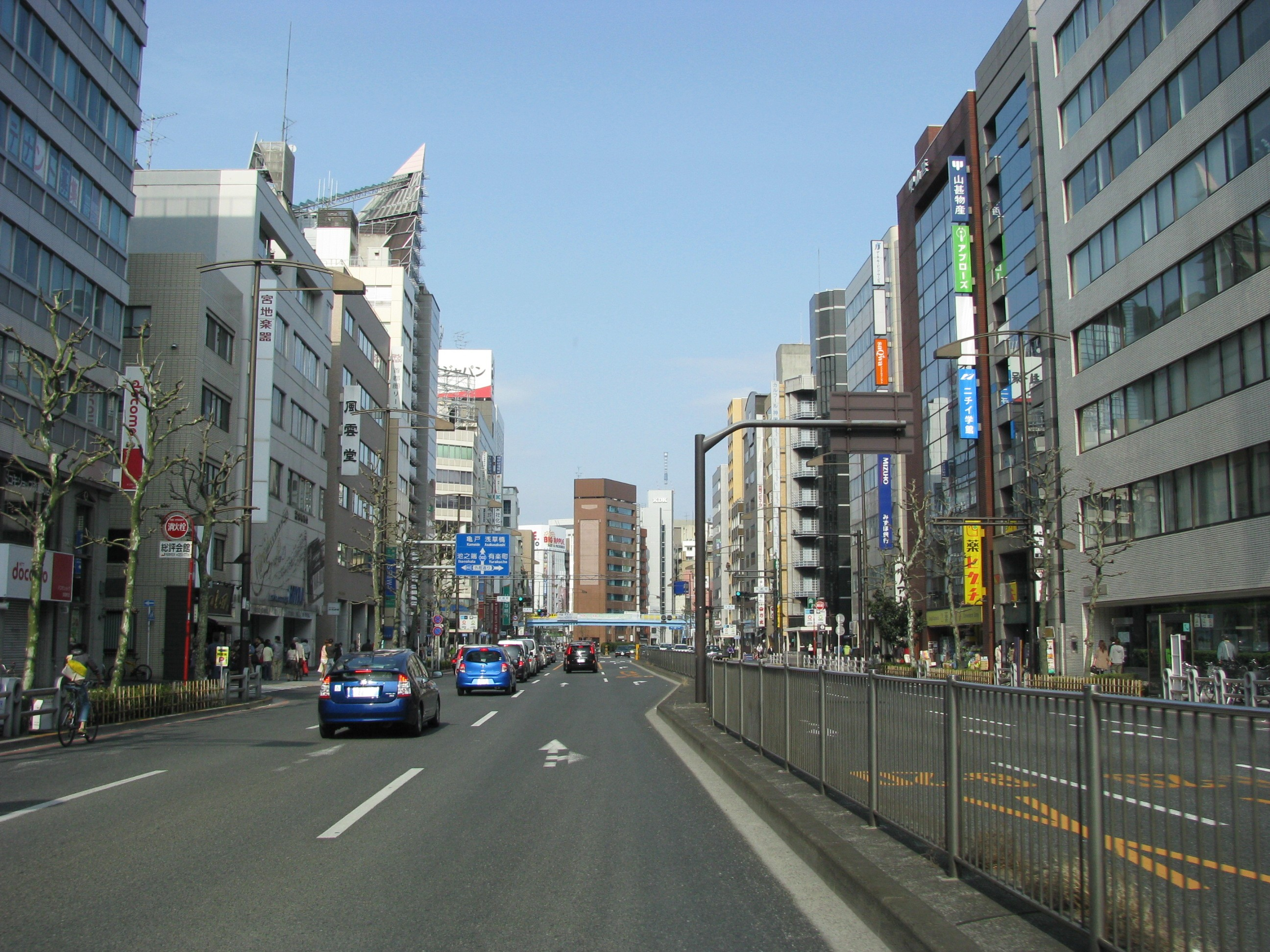
Tokyo Route 302 -01

Ogawamachi (小川町), or formally Kanda-Ogawamachi (神田小川町), is a district in Chiyoda, Tokyo, Japan. It consists of 3 chōme. As of March 1, 2007, the district's population is 875.

Kanda-Ogawamachi is located on the northern part of Chiyoda. It borders Kanda-Sarugakuchō, Kanda-Surugadai and Kanda-Awajichō to the north, Kanda-Sudachō to the east, Kanda-Nishikichō, Kanda-Tsukasamachi and Kanda-Mitoshirochō to the south, and Kanda-Jinbōchō to the east.

A commercial neighborhood, Kanda-Ogawamachi is home to a number of buildings and stores. Notably, many sporting-goods stores can be found on Yasukuni-Dori Ave. Since the district is located adjacent to Kanda-Jinbōchō, home to a massive book town, several publishers and bookstores can be found as well.

== Education ==
Chiyoda Board of Education operates public elementary and junior high schools. Shōhei Elementary School (千代田区立昌平小学校) is the zoned elementary school for Kanda-Ogawamachi 1-chōme. Ochanomizu Elementary School (お茶の水小学校) is the zoned elementary school for Kanda-Ogawamachi 2-3-chōme. There is a freedom of choice system for junior high schools in Chiyoda Ward, and so there are no specific junior high school zones.
