= Iwamotochō =

District of Chiyoda, Tokyo, Japan

Coordinates: 35.6948°N 139.7760°E

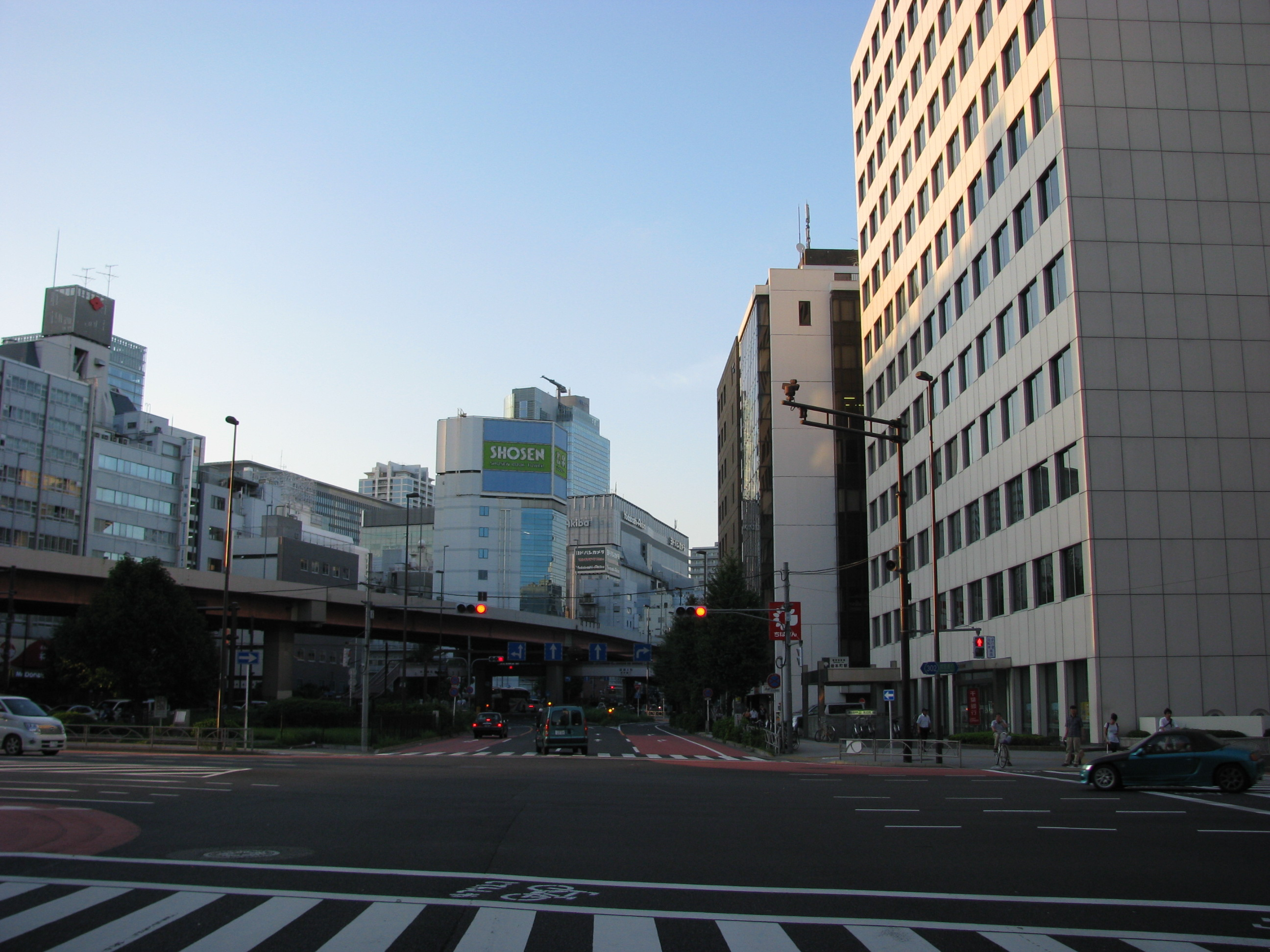
Iwamotocho -01

Iwamotochō (岩本町) and Kanda-Iwamotochō (神田岩本町) are a joined pair of districts of Chiyoda, Tokyo, Japan. They consist of 3 chōme. As of April 1, 2007, the total population of the two districts is 1,989.

Iwamotochō is located in the northeastern part of Chiyoda. The area consisting of both Iwamotochō and Kanda-Iwamotochō borders Kanda-Sakumakaji and Kanda-Sakumachō to the north; Higashi-Kanda to the east; Nihonbashi-Kodenmachō and Nihonbashi-Honchō, Chūō to the south; and Kanda-Sudachō, Kanda-Higashimatsushitachō, Kanda-Higashikonyachō, Kanda-Konyachō, Kanda-Nishifukudachō and Kanda-Mikurachō to the west.

Showa-Dori Avenue runs between Iwamotochō and Kanda-Iwamotochō. Iwamotochō, located east to the avenue, has already undergone modernization of the addressing system while, in Kanda-Iwamotochō, located west to the avenue, the modernization has not been enforced yet. In Chiyoda, many districts in the Kanda area has the prefix Kanda-; the addressing system modernization has not been enforced in such districts.

Iwamotocho Station is located on the border between the Kanda-Iwamotochō and Iwamotochō districts.

== Companies ==
=== Iwamotochō 2-chōme ===
- Nippon Chemiphar
- Sugatsune

=== Iwamotochō 3-chōme ===
- Yamazaki Baking

== Education ==
Chiyoda Board of Education operates public elementary and junior high schools. Chiyoda Elementary School (千代田小学校) is the zoned elementary school for Iwamotochō 1 chōme 1-6 ban, Iwamotochō 2 chōme 1-8 ban, Iwamotochō 2 chōme 1-2 ban, and Kanda-Iwamotochō. Izumi Elementary School (和泉小学校) is the zoned elementary school for Iwamotochō 1 chōme 7-14 ban, Iwamotochō 2 chōme 9-19 ban, and Iwamotochō 3 chōme 3-11 ban. There is a freedom of choice system for junior high schools in Chiyoda Ward, and so there are no specific junior high school zones.
