= Kajichō, Tokyo =

Coordinates: 35.6917°N 139.7709°E

Kajichō 鍛冶町
- District
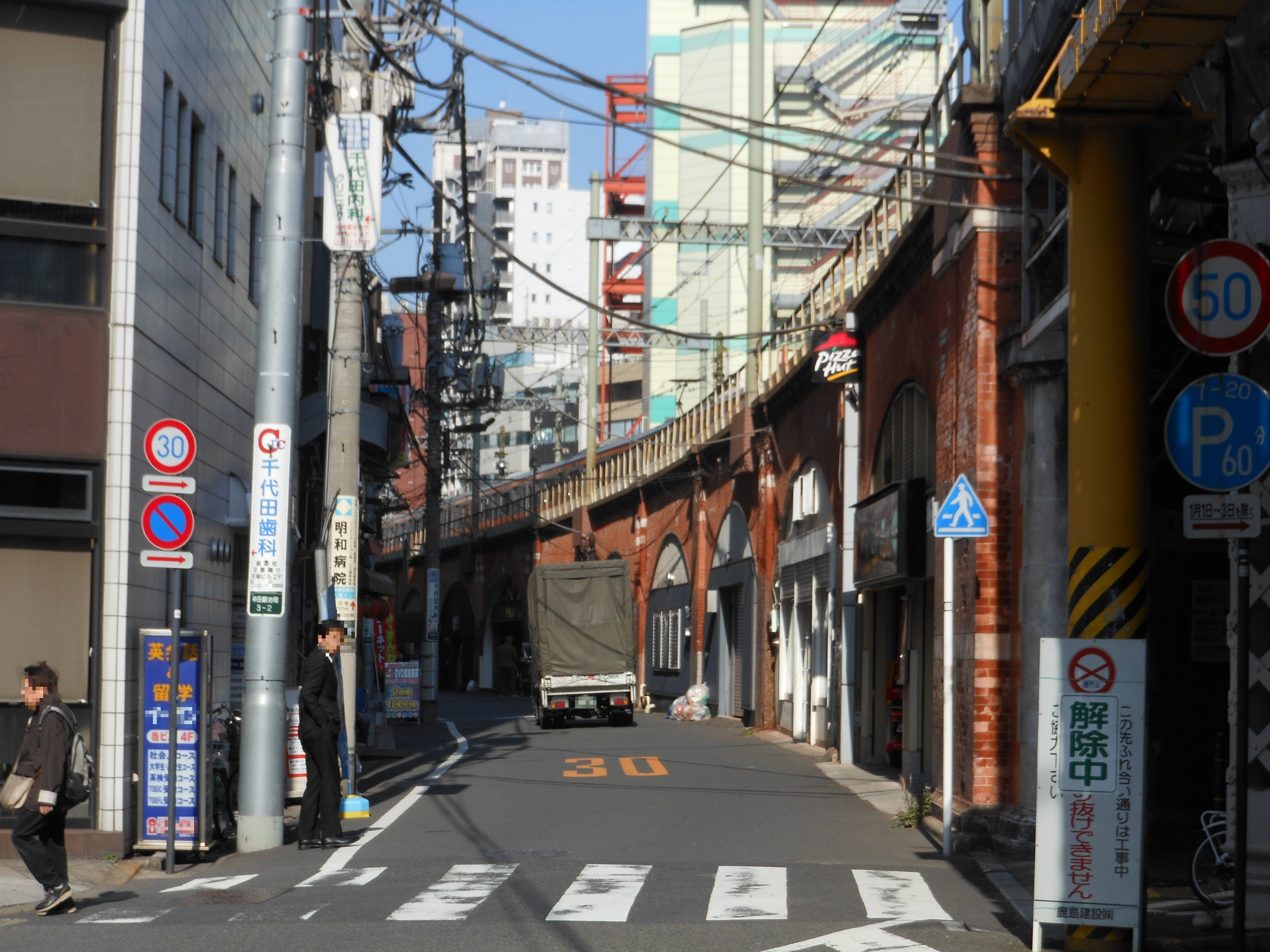
- Kanda-Kajicho 3 chome
- Interactive map of Kajichō
- Country: Japan
- City: Tokyo
- Special ward: Chiyoda

Population (April 1, 2007)
  - Total: 371

Kajichō (鍛冶町) is a district of Chiyoda, Tokyo, Japan. It consists of Kajichō 1-chōme and Kajichō 2-chōme. This article also explains about Kanda-Kajichō (神田鍛冶町), which today only has Kanda-Kajichō 3-chōme. As of April 1, 2007, the total population of the two districts is 371.

These districts are located on the northeastern part of Chiyoda. The combined area of Kajichō and Kanda-Kajichō borders Kanda-Sudachō to the north, Kanda-Higashimatsushitachō, Kanda-Tomiyamachō, Kanda-Konyachō, Kanda-Kitanorimonochō, Kanda-Nishifukudachō and Kanda-Mikurachō to the east, Nihonbashi-Muromachi, Nihonbashi-Hongokuchō and Nihonbashi-Honchō to the south, and Uchi-Kanda and Kanda-Tsukasachō to the west.

Modernization of addressing system has already been enforced in Kajichō 1-chōme and Kajichō 2-chōme but not yet in Kanda-Kajichō 3-chōme. Formerly, Kajichō 1-chōme and Kajichō 2-chōme were "Kanda-Kajichō 1-chōme" and "Kanda-Kajichō 2-chōme," respectively. In general, a districts with "Kanda-" prefix represents that the district belonged to the former Kanda Ward (神田区, Kanda-ku) and is yet to undergo addressing system modernization.

Kajichō and Kanda-Kajichō are business districts near Kanda Station, home to a number of office buildings and stores. Kanda Station is located on the west edge of Kajichō. In Edo-era Japan, Kajichō was the home to craftsmen, such as carpenters, lacquerers, and smiths. As a result, it was partitioned into small properties, and today has many small buildings, home to restaurants and other businesses, making a strong contrast with the skyscrapers of the former samurai district in neighboring Nihonbashi such as the Bank of Japan headquarters.

== Education ==
Chiyoda Board of Education operates public elementary and junior high schools. Chiyoda Elementary School (千代田小学校) is the zoned elementary school for Kajichō 1-2 chōme and Kanda-Kajichō 3-chōme. There is a freedom of choice system for junior high schools in Chiyoda Ward, and so there are no specific junior high school zones.
