= Japanese addressing system =

System used to identify a specific location in Japan

The Japanese addressing system is used to identify a specific location in Japan.

When written in Japanese characters, addresses start with the largest geographical entity and proceed to the most specific one. The Japanese system is complex, the product of the natural growth of urban areas, as opposed to the systems used in cities that are laid out as grids and divided into quadrants or districts.

When written in Latin characters, addresses follow the convention used by most Western addresses and start with the smallest geographic entity (typically a house number) and proceed to the largest. However, even when translated using Latin characters, Japan Post requires that the address also is written in Japanese to ensure correct delivery.

== Address parts ==
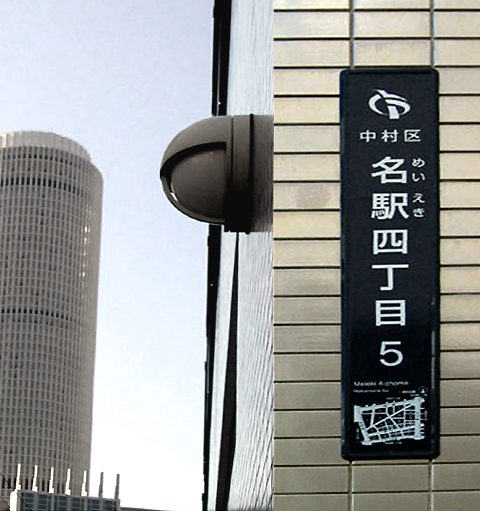
A town block indicator plate (街区表示板, gaiku-hyōjiban) displaying the address Nakamura-ku, Meieki 4-chōme, 5-banchi (in Nagoya)

Japanese addresses begin with the largest division of the country, the prefecture. Most of these are called ken (県), but there are also three other special prefecture designations: to (都) for Tokyo, dō (道) for Hokkaido and fu (府) for the two urban prefectures of Osaka and Kyoto.

Following the prefecture is the municipality. For a large municipality this is the city (市, shi). Cities that have a large enough population (greater than 500,000 residents) and are regarded as such by order of the Cabinet of Japan are called designated cities, and are subdivided into wards (区, ku), where in the prefecture of Tokyo, 23 of them are designated as the special ward (特別区, tokubetsu-ku) with added authority to the mayors. For smaller municipalities, the address includes the district (郡, gun) followed by the town (chō or machi, 町) or village (mura or son, 村). In Japan, a city is separate from districts, which contain towns and villages.

For addressing purposes, municipalities may be divided into chō or machi (two different readings of the character 町, depending on the particular case) and/or aza (字). Despite using the same character as town, the machi here is purely a unit of address, not administration; likewise, there are also ku address divisions that are not administrative special wards. There are two common schemes:

1. Municipality is divided first into machi and then into city districts (丁目, chōme). Example: 台東区[浅草四丁目] (Taitō-ku, [Asakusa, 4-chōme])
2. Municipality is divided into ō-aza (大字), which may be divided into aza (字), which may in turn be divided into ko-aza (小字). Example: 青森市[大字滝沢字住吉] (Aomori-shi, [ō-aza Takizawa, aza Sumiyoshi])

However, exceptions abound, and the line between the schemes is often blurry as there are no clear delimiters for machi, aza, etc. There are also some municipalities like Ryūgasaki, Ibaraki, which do not use any subdivisions.

Below this level, two styles of addressing are possible.

1. In the newer jūkyo hyōji (住居表示) style, enacted into law by the 1962 Act on Indication of Residential Address (住居表示に関する法律) and used by the majority of the country, the next level is the city block (街区, gaiku), always followed by the building number (番号, bangō). Building 10 in block 5 would be formally written as 5番10号 (5-ban 10-gō). For apartment buildings, the apartment number (部屋番号, heya bangō) may be appended to the building with a hyphen, so apartment 103 in the aforementioned building would be 5番10-103号.
2. In the older chiban (地番) style, still used in some rural and older city areas, the next level is the area/block name (地区, chiku; often abbreviated as 区, ku), the next smaller level is the lot number (番地, banchi), optionally followed by a lot number extension (formally shigō (支号), more often edaban (枝番)). The lot number designates a plot of land registered in the land registry, and a lot number extension is assigned when a piece of land is divided into two or more pieces in the registry. This can be written as any of 3番地5 (3-banchi 5), 3番地の5 (3-banchi-no 5) or 3番5 (3-ban 5). Land not designated by the registry is known as mubanchi (無番地), with any dwellings there being bangaichi (番外地).

Sometimes multiple houses share a given lot number, in which case the name (either just family name, or full name of resident) must also be specified; this name is generally displayed in front of the house on a hyōsatsu (表札; name plate), often decoratively presented, as are house numbers in other countries. In one extreme case, 250 houses in the Sagiyama district of Gifu shared the same address from 1950 until 2019.

In both styles, since all address elements from chōme down are numeric, in casual use it is common to form them into a string separated by hyphens or the possessive suffix の (no), resulting in Asakusa 4-5-10 or Asakusa 4の5の10. This renders the two styles indistinguishable, but since each municipality adopts one style or the other, there is no risk of ambiguity. The apartment number may also be appended, resulting in 4-5-10-103.

A sign displaying the town address Kamimeguro 2-chōme; block (gaiku) 21, building (bangō) 9 identifies the residential address. The upper plaque is the district name plate (町名板, chōmei ban) and the lower, the residential number plate (住居番号板, jūkyo bangō ban).

Street names are seldom used in postal addresses (except in Kyoto and some Hokkaido cities such as Sapporo. See below.)

Banchi blocks often have an irregular shape, as banchi numbers were assigned by order of registration in the older system, meaning that especially in older areas of the city they will not run in a linear order. For this reason, when giving directions to a location, people will often offer cross streets, visual landmarks and subway stations, such as "at Chūō-dori and Matsuya-dori across the street from Matsuya and Ginza station" for a store in Tokyo. Many businesses feature maps on their literature and business cards. Signs attached to utility poles often specify the city district name and block number, and detailed block maps of the immediate area are sometimes posted near bus stops and train stations in larger cities.

In addition to the address itself, all locations in Japan have a postal code. After the reform of 1998, this begins with a three-digit number, a hyphen, and a four-digit number, for example 123-4567. A postal mark, 〒, may precede the code to indicate that the number following is a postal code.

== Address order ==
In Japanese, the address is written in order from largest unit to smallest, with the addressee's name last of all. For example, the address of the Tōkyō Central Post Office is

〒100-8994
東京都千代田区丸ノ内二丁目7番2号
東京中央郵便局

〒100-8994
Tōkyō-to Chiyoda-ku Marunouchi 2-Chōme 7-ban 2-gō
Tōkyō Chūō Yūbin-kyoku

or

〒100-8994
東京都千代田区丸ノ内2-7-2
東京中央郵便局

〒100-8994
Tōkyō-to Chiyoda-ku Marunouchi 2-7-2
Tōkyō Chūō Yūbin-kyoku

The order is reversed when writing in rōmaji. The format recommended by Japan Post is:

Tokyo Central Post Office
7-2, Marunouchi 2-Chome
Chiyoda-ku, Tokyo 100-8994

In this address, Tokyo is the prefecture; Chiyoda-ku is one of the special wards; Marunouchi 2-Chome is the name of the city district; and 7-2 is the city block and building number. In practice it is common for the chōme to be prefixed, as in Japanese, resulting in the somewhat shorter:

Tokyo Central Post Office
2-7-2 Marunouchi, Chiyoda-ku
Tokyo 100-8994

While almost all elements of the address are reversed when written in rōmaji, connected strings of numbers are treated as units and not reversed. Firstly, the "city block and building number" is a unit, and its digits are not reversed – in this example it is "7-2" in both Japanese and roman, though the Japanese (literally Marunouchi 2-Chōme 7-2) is partly reversed to "7-2, Marunouchi 2-Chōme" in roman if chōme is separate. Similarly, if the chōme is included, these also form a unit, so in this example the string is 2-7-2 in both Japanese and Western alphabet.

== Special cases ==
As mentioned above, there are certain areas of Japan that use somewhat unusual address systems. Sometimes the differing system has been incorporated into the official system, as in Sapporo, while in Kyoto the system is completely different from, but used alongside the official system. Kyoto and Sapporo have addresses based on their streets being laid out in a grid plan, unlike most Japanese cities.

=== Kyoto ===
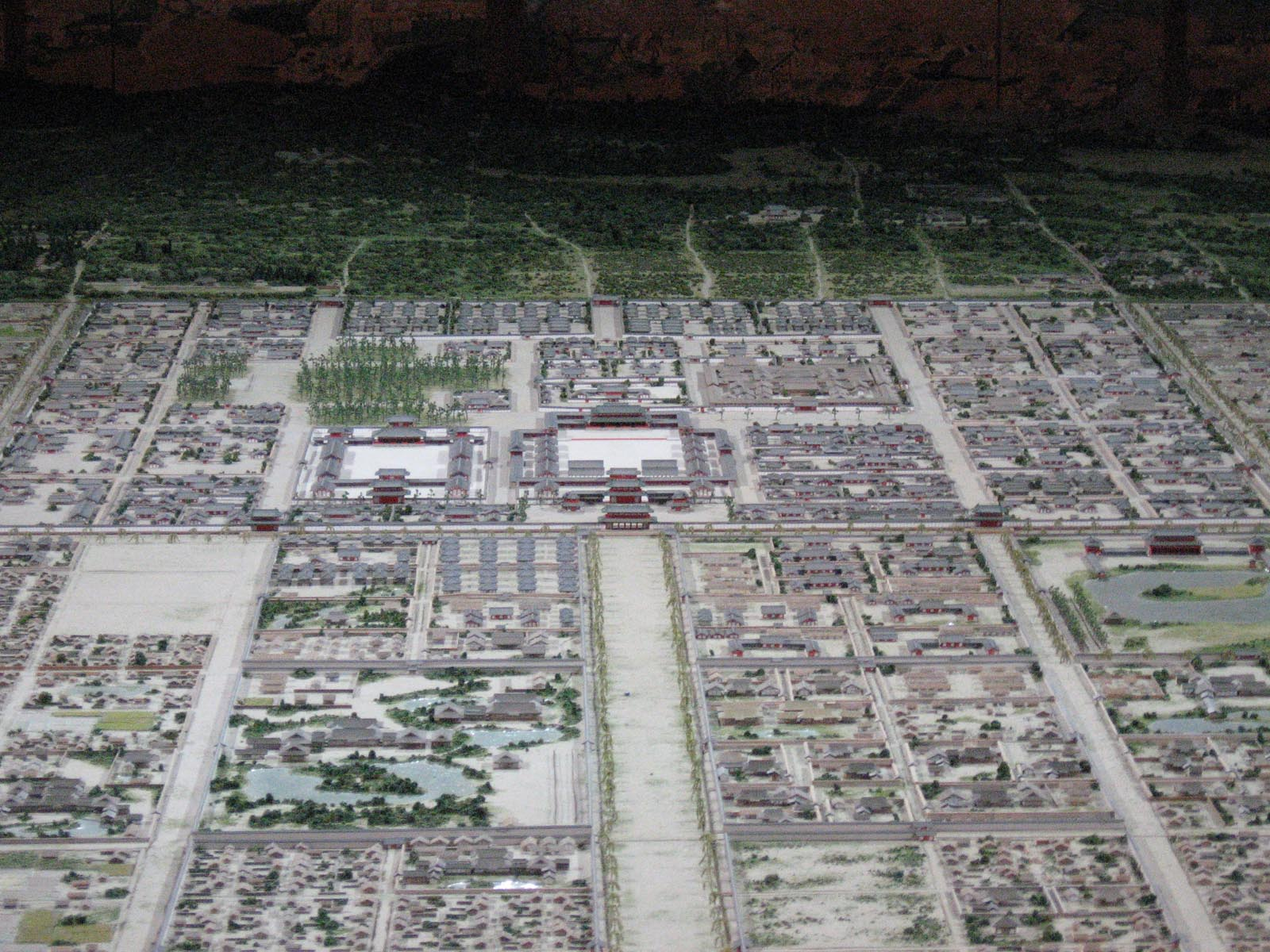
Heian-kyō was laid out on a grid in AD 794, and grid-based addresses continue to be used in today's Kyoto.

Although the official national addressing system is in use in Kyoto – in Chiban style, with ward (区, ku), district (丁目, chōme), and land number (番地, banchi), the chō divisions are very small, numerous, and there is often more than one chō with the same name within a single ward, making the system extremely confusing. As a result, most residents of Kyoto use an unofficial system based instead on street names, a form of vernacular geography. This system is, however, recognized by the post office and by government agencies. For added precision, the street-based address can be given, followed by the chō and land number.

The system works by naming the intersection of two streets and then indicating if the address is north (上ル, agaru; "above"), south (下ル, sagaru; "below"), east (東入ル, higashi-iru; "enter east"), or west (西入ル, nishi-iru; "enter west") of the intersection. More precisely, the two streets of the intersection are not treated symmetrically: one names the street that the address is on, then gives a nearby cross street, and then specifies the address relative to the cross street. What this means is that a building can have more than one address depending on which cross street intersection is chosen.

For instance, the address of Kyoto Tower is listed on their website as:

〒600-8216
京都市下京区烏丸通七条下ル 東塩小路町 721-1

Following the postcode, this contains the city and ward, followed by the unofficial address, a space, and then the official address:

京都市下京区 Kyōto-shi, Shimogyō-ku
烏丸七条下ル Karasuma-Shichijō-sagaru
東塩小路町 721-1 Higashi-Shiokōji 721-1

This address means "south of the intersection of Karasuma and Shichijō streets" – more precisely, "on Karasuma, below (south of) Shichijō" (Karasuma runs north–south, while Shichijō is an east–west cross street). The street address may alternatively be given as 烏丸通七条下ル (with street (通, dōri) inserted), indicating clearly that the address is on Karasuma street.

However, the system is flexible and allows for various alternatives, such as:

京都府京都市下京区烏丸塩小路上ル
Kyōto-fu, Kyōto-shi, Shimogyō-ku, Karasuma-Shiokōji-agaru
"(On) Karasuma (street), above (north of) Shiokōji (street)"

For less well known buildings, the official address is often given after the informal one, as in the address for the Shinatora Ramen restaurant:

京都府京都市下京区烏丸通五条下ル大坂町384
Kyōto-fu, Kyōto-shi, Shimogyō-ku, Karasuma-dōri-Gojō-sagaru, Ōsakachō 384
"Ōsakachō 384, (on) Karasuma street, below (south of) Gojō"

As the initial part of the address is familiar, it is often abbreviated – for example, Kyōto-fu, Kyōto-shi (京都府京都市; "Kyoto Prefecture, Kyoto City") can be abbreviated to Kyōto-shi (京都市; "Kyoto City"), as in the Kyoto Tower listing. More informally, particularly on return addresses for in-town mail, the city and ward can be abbreviated to the initial character, with a dot or comma to indicate abbreviation – there are only 11 wards of Kyoto, so this is easily understood. For example, 京都市 (Kyōto-shi) is abbreviated to 京 (Kyō–) and 下京区 (Shimogyō-ku) is abbreviated to 下 (Shimo–). Combining these (and dropping okurigana), one may abbreviate the address of Kyoto Tower to:

〒600-8216
京、下、烏丸七条下
Karasuma-Shichijō-sagaru, Shimo–, Kyō–, 600-8216

=== Sapporo ===
Sapporo's system, though official, differs in structure from regular Japanese addresses. The city center is divided into quadrants by two intersecting roads, Kita-Ichijo and Soseigawa; blocks are then named based on their distance from this point, and farther from the city center, multiple blocks are included in each. The east–west distance is indicated by chōme (a slightly unorthodox usage of chōme), while the north–south distance is indicated by jō, which has been incorporated into the chō name.

The address to Sapporo JR Tower is:

札幌市中央区北5条西2丁目5番地
Sapporo-shi, Chūō-ku, kita-5-jō-nishi 2-chōme 5-banchi

This address indicates that it is the fifth building on a block located on 5 jō north and 2 chōme west of the center, named with the actual cardinal names of kita (north), minami (south), nishi (west), and higashi (east). The directional names for jō extend for about 7 kilometers to the north–south along the main Soseigawa Dori, but only about 3 kilometers at the most to the east and west; outside of that area, jō have other names, though the starting point of each is still the corner in the direction of the city center, often using landmarks such as the Hakodate Main Line or large roads to mark the new numbering.

For example, far in the outskirts is the Sapporo Tachibana Hospital, at:

〒006-0841 札幌市手稲区曙11条2丁目3番12号
Sapporo-shi, Teine-ku, Akebono-11-jō, 2-chōme-3-ban-12-gō

Building 12 on block 3 of a chōme measuring 11 jō north and 2 chōme west of where the Hakodate Main Line meets Tarukawa Street. Or Toyohira Ward office, at:

〒062-0934 札幌市豊平区平岸6条10丁目1-1
Sapporo, Toyohira-ku, Hiragishi-6-jō, 10-chōme-1-ban-1-gō

Building 1 on block 1 of a chōme measuring 6 jō south and 10 chōme east of where a small street meets the Toyohira River. The direction is understood based on the quadrant of the city the jō is considered to be in, which may be off from the actual direction to the city center, depending on the landmark used.

Far-flung and less crowded parts of the city may instead use a standard chō name, rather than a numbered jō, such as Makomanai.

=== Ōita ===
Many areas of Ōita Prefecture including the cities of Ōita and Usuki commonly use an unofficial parallel system known as "administrative wards" (行政区, gyōseiku) or "neighbourhood council names" (自治会名, jichikaimei). While outwardly similar, these addresses end in kumi (組) or ku (区):

大分県大分市羽屋4-1-A組
Haneya 4-1-A-kumi, Ōita-shi, Ōita-ken

大分県臼杵市臼杵洲崎四丁目1組
Suzaki 4-chōme 1-kumi, Usuki-shi, Ōita-ken

As the names indicate, these derive from traditional neighbourhood councils. While they continue to be used locally (e.g. school and electoral districts) and may be accepted for mail delivery, they are not considered official addresses, and individual buildings in each kumi will also have a standard ōaza-banchi address. For example, Usuki City Hall, while within Suzaki 4-chome 1-kumi, has the formal address of Usuki 72–1, which may be prepended with ōaza for clarity:

〒875-8501
大分県臼杵市大字臼杵72-1
Ōaza Usuki 72-1, Usuki-shi, Ōita-ken 875-8501

=== Katakana blocks (bu) ===
Some cities in Ishikawa Prefecture, including Kanazawa and Nanao, sometimes use katakana in the iroha ordering (イ・ロ・ハ・ニ ... ) instead of numbers for blocks. These are called bu (部). For example, the address of the Kagaya Hotel in Nanao is:

〒926-0192
石川県七尾市和倉町ヨ80
Wakuramachi yo 80, Nanao-shi, Ishikawa-ken 926-0192

=== Jikkan instead of numbered chōme ===
Some cities, including parts of Nagaoka, Niigata, use jikkan (甲・乙・丙 ... ) prefixed to the block number to indicate traditional divisions. These function similarly to chōme and are treated as such in addresses. For example, Yoita police station in Nagaoka has the address:

〒940-2402
新潟県長岡市与板町与板乙5881-3
Yoita-otsu 5881-3, Yoita-machi, Nagaoka-shi, Niigata-ken 940-2402

== History ==
The current addressing system was established after World War II as a slight modification of the scheme used since the Meiji era.

For historical reasons, names quite frequently conflict. It is typical in Hokkaidō where many place names are identical to those found in the rest of Japan, for example Shin-Hiroshima (literally new Hiroshima) to Hiroshima, largely as the result of the systematic group emigration projects since the late 19th century to Hokkaido; people from villages across mainland Japan dreamt to become wealthy farmers. Historians note that there is also a significant similarity between place names in Kansai region and those in northern Kyūshū. See Japanese place names for more.

== Named roads ==
Named roads (通り, tōri or dōri) are roads or sections deemed noteworthy and given a name. Unlike in other nations, named roads are not used in addresses but merely for logistic purposes, with the exception of the aforementioned Kyoto system.

== Gallery ==
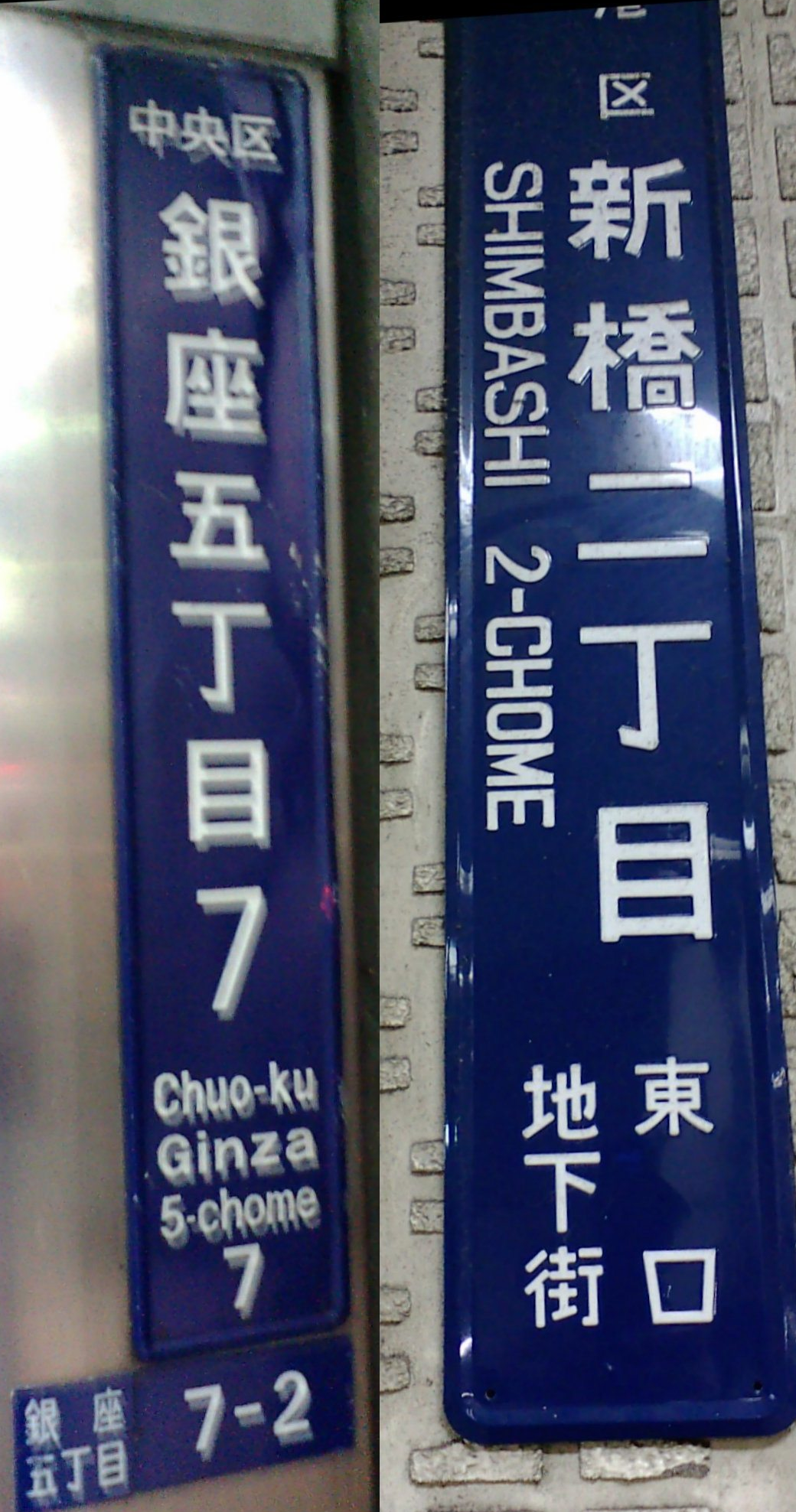
Two "chōmei-name plates" (町名板) including rōmaji for people unable to read the Japanese. (L) - A plate in standard style in larger cities. The letters on the plate indicates from the top Chuō Ward (中央区, Chuō-ku) and block 7, 5th chōme (銀座五丁目7, Ginza go-chōme nana). At the very bottom, 7-2 stands for block 7, number (banchi) 2. Pictured on the Ginza 4-chōme koban police box at the Ginza 4-chōme crossing, on Ginza main street facing to Wakō. (R) - Pictured is the one without any banchi numbers at the 2nd block in Shimbashi (新橋二丁目, Shimbashi ni-chōme). In Japanese writing at the bottom, it reads "you are in the underground city at the east gate" (東口地下街, Higashi-guchi chikagai), but the name for Shimbashi station is not indicated.

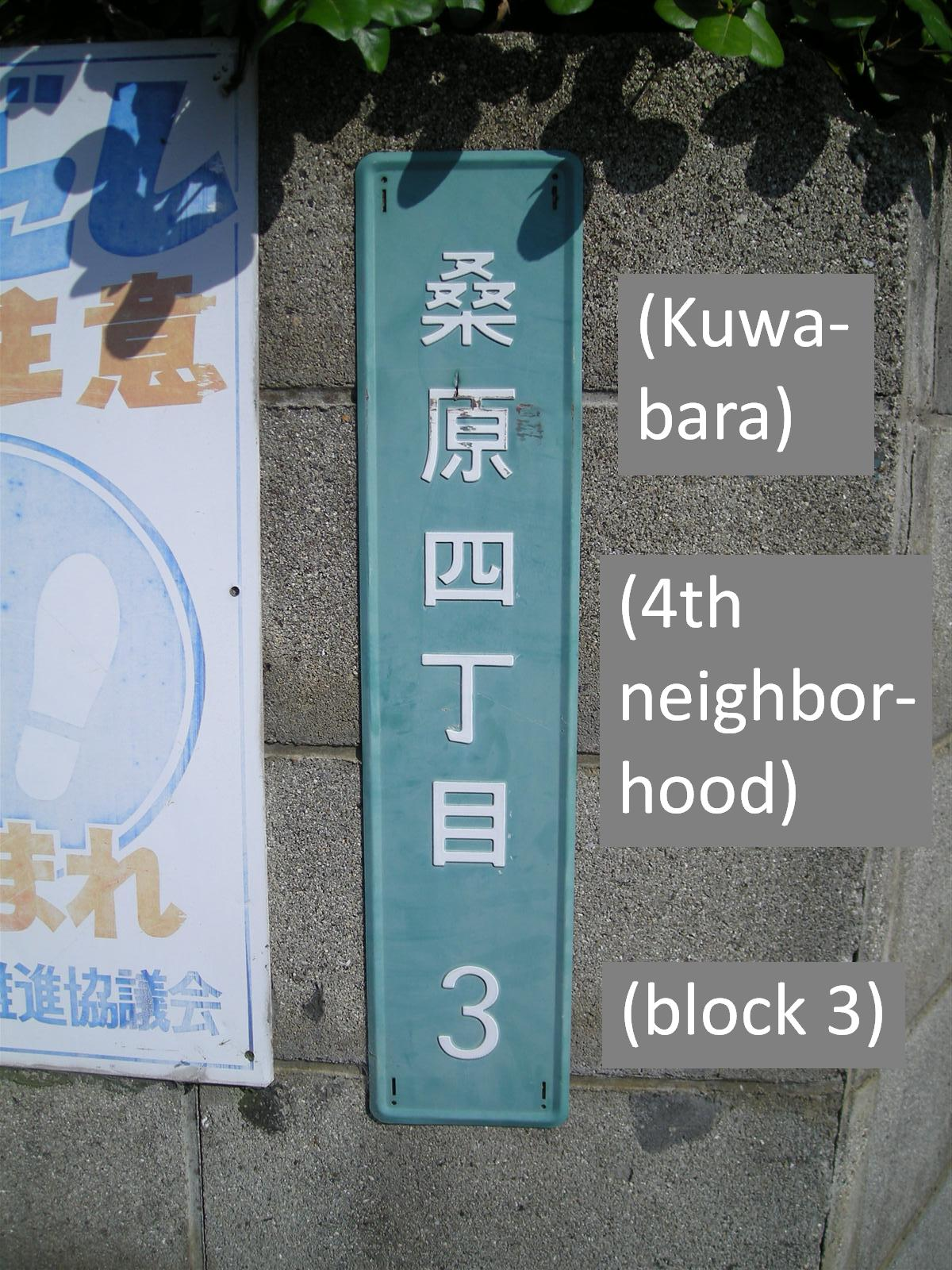
In the residential area, this type of green street address or chōmei name plates are applied. Pictured is an old type without roman scripts or city name, at Kuwabara in Matsuyama, Ehime. The address of the city block in Japanese means block 3, 4-chōme, Kuwabara town (桑原四丁目3, Kuwabara yon-chōme san).

== See also ==
- House numbering
