= Banchō =

Area in Chiyoda, Tokyo, Japan

Coordinates: 35°41′19″N 139°44′26″E

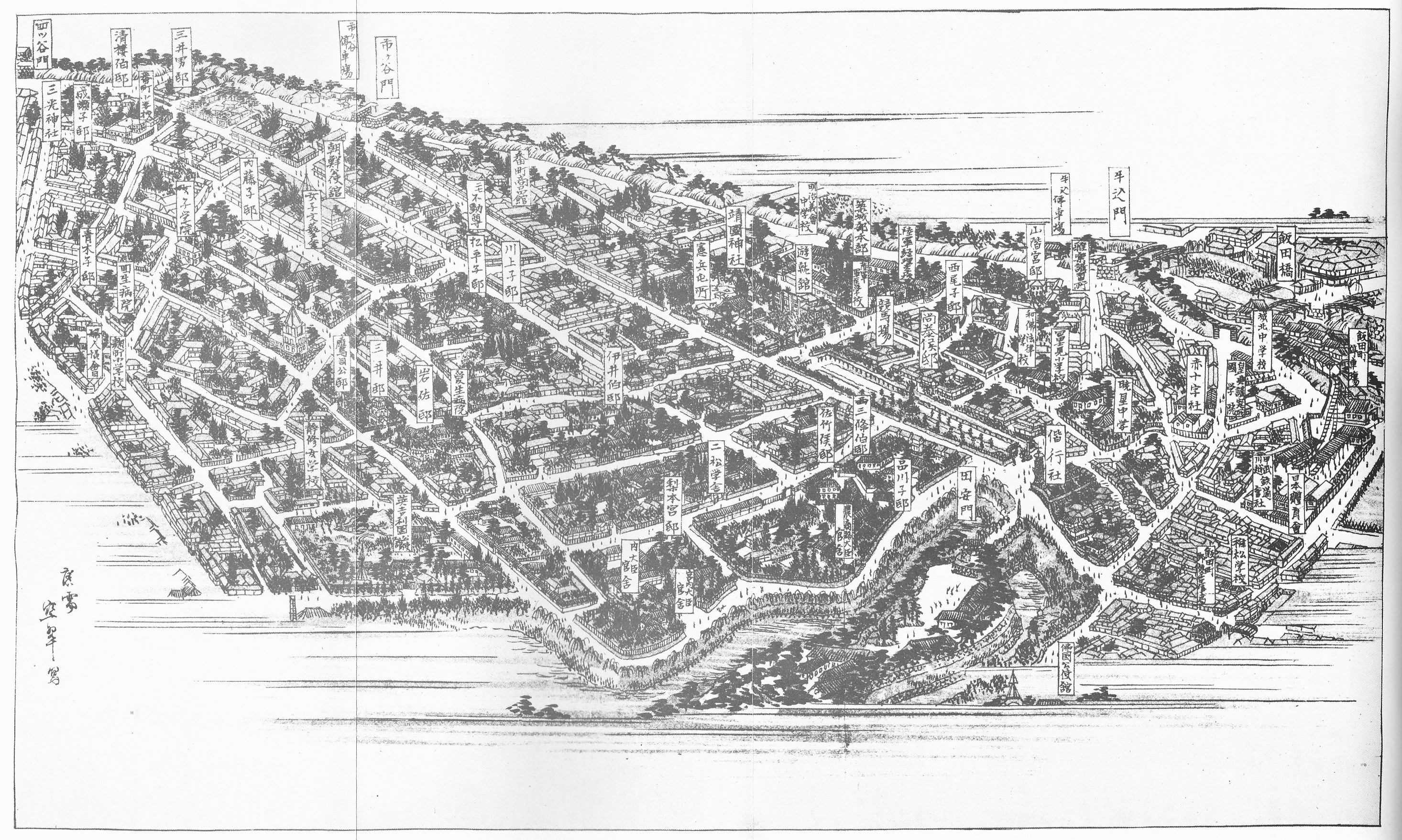
Banchō sōzu (A Panorama of Banchō area), 1898

Banchō (番町) is an area in Chiyoda, Tokyo, Japan, consisting of the six "-banchō" districts, Ichibanchō (一番町) to Rokubanchō (六番町), as well as parts of Kudanminami and Kudankita, and Fujimi.

The Banchō area is located to the west of the Imperial Palace. The historical area is roughly triangular in shape, Shinjuku Ave (新宿通り) forms its southern boundary. A rough line from Hanzō Moat (半蔵濠, Hanzō-bori) to Ushigome Mitsuke (牛込見附) forms its eastern boundary, and the railway of the Chūō Main Line along the outer moats of Ichigaya and Ushigome forms its northwestern boundary from Yotsuya to Ushigome Mitsuke.

Yasukuni Ave (靖国通り) runs through its historical boundaries. Present day area with "Banchō" in the districts names stops south of this avenue.

== History ==
=== Edo period ===
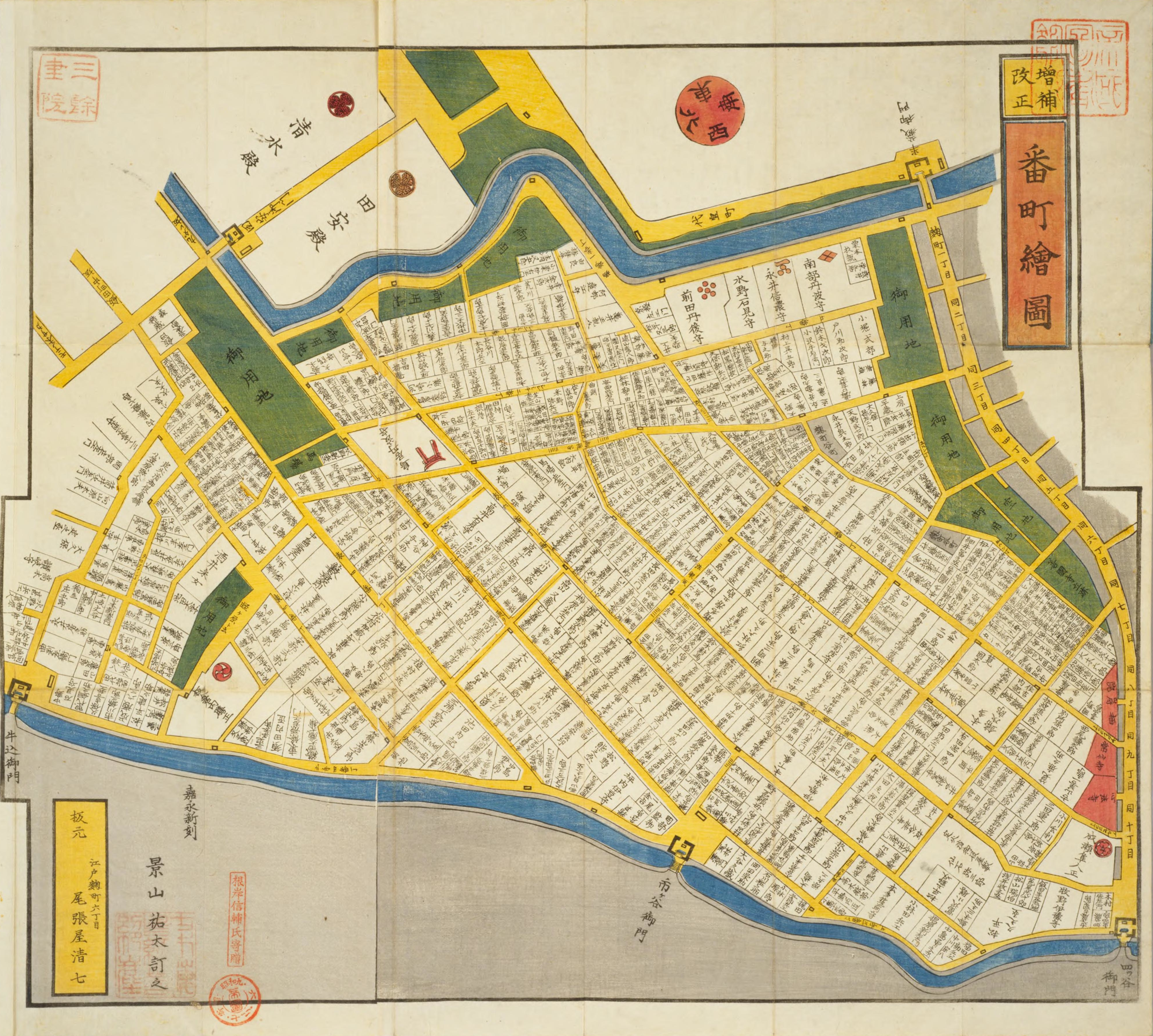
Oedo Banchō Kiriezu (Map of Banchō in Edo), mid19th-century

The area was the location of the residences of the six Oban (大番) groups, the hatamoto samurai in charge of the guard of the Edo castle.

During Edo times the area was very uniform, packed in hatamoto residences resembling each other with no signage, making it difficult for external visitors to find a specific residence. Some shogunate stables, umaya (厩), were said to be aligned at the bottom of a slope, giving its name to the slope Onmayadanisaka (御厩谷坂, slope of the valley of the stables) in Sanbanchō.

No hatamoto residence subsists to this day in Banchō, there is however a small memorial in front of the entrance of the Nippon Dental University in Fujimi, indicating the location of the residence of the hatamoto Tominaga Kenzaemon, which was marked in a map dating from the Enpo era in the 17th century and whose lineage served until the end of the shogunate.

In 1793, the blind scholar Hanawa Hokiichi founded Wagakukōdansho (和学講談所, Institute of Lectures of Japanese classics) in nowadays Yonbanchō, which moved to Omote-Rokubanchō, near nowadays Sanbanchō-24. As the Shogunate was nearing its end, Omura Masujiro opened in 1856 Kyukyodo (鳩居堂), a rangaku institute in his residence, located next to nowadays Chidorigafuchi National Cemetery.

=== Meiji and after ===
At the Meiji restoration, hatamoto and feudal residences emptying, many Kazoku nobles and high-ranked officials of the newly formed government moved into the area, thanks to its proximity to the palace. Yamagata Aritomo set up a personal residence in 1885 right in front of Chidorigafuchi moat, and used it as his Tokyo residence from 1917, where present day Sanbanchō Kyoyo-Kaigisho stands in Kudanminami. Tōgō Heihachirō moved to Banchō in 1881 and lived there for 54 years. The location of his residence is the Togo Gensui Memorial Park (東郷元帥記念公園) in Sanbanchō, and a slope in Yonbanchō is named after him. Other prominent politicians (including several prime ministers), top military officers and businessmen such as Aoki Shuzo, Akiyama Yoshifuru, Wakatsuki Reijiro, Katō Takaaki, Katō Hiroyuki and Kawakami Soroku took their residences in the area.

In 1869, a site on top of the Kudan hill was selected for the Tōkyō Shōkonsha (東京招魂社, shrine to summon the souls) to relieve the souls of the dead of the Bonin war, renamed Yasukuni Shrine in 1879.

In 1872, under Sir Harry Smith Parkes, the British legation obtained land on the site of several feudal and hatamoto residences, in modern-day Ichibanchō. The construction of the building was finished in 1874. One of the most prominent actors of the early Anglo-Japanese relations, Sir Ernest Satow, moved in Banchō as the sixth British Minister to Japan from 1895 to 1900. The legation was upgraded to an embassy in 1905. The present building dates from 1929, after the Great Kanto Earthquake.

The area became a favorite for intellectuals, with multiple famous scholars and people of letters living in Banchō in the late XIXth, early XXth: Tōson Shimazaki, Kyōka Izumi, Yosano Akiko and her husband Tekkan Yosano, Tsuguharu Foujita and Rentarō Taki lived at one point in the area, a street crossing Banchō has been named Banchō Bunjin Dori (番町文人通り, the street of the scholars of Banchō). Educational facilities flourished, philosopher and politician Nakae Chōmin set up a French language school in 1874, France gakusha (仏蘭西学者; litt. "Institute of French studies"), later Futsugakujuku (仏学塾) along the Nishichidori ave., and Georges Ferdinant Bigot lived in the area as a teacher. In 1876, Sakurai Chika founded an English-speaking school for girls, the precursor of the Joshi Gakuin school. In 1917, the private needlework school for girls founded by Otsuma Kotaka in 1908 moved to Sanbanchō, and would later become Otsuma Women's University.

After the Great Kanto Earthquake, the Yasukuni Avenue was enlarged and redeveloped along the Kudan slope.

=== Modern Banchō ===
The area is primarily residential, with several renowned educational facilities (Otsuma Women's University, Tokyo Kasei-Gakuin University, Banchō Elementary School, Chiyoda International School Tokyo, Tokyo Chinese School, Kudan Elementary School, Joshi Gakuin Junior and Highschool, Hosei University, etc.) several embassies (British, Israel, Tunisia, Luxemburg, Belgium, Timor-Leste, Apostolic Nunciature as well as the de facto embassy of DPRK), and a few offices and commercial facilities, notably along the Yasukuni Dori avenue and Nihon TV street avenues. The residences are mostly mid-sized multi-family buildings, with a handful individual houses.

Only a few large companies have their HQ in Banchō, most notably Seven & I Holdings Co. and Sony Music Entertainment.

Banchō is consistently ranked as the most exclusive and expensive residential area in Tokyo (and in Japan).

== Renaming ==
In 1873, the area north of modern Yasukuni Dōri was split from former Sanbanchō and Yonbanchō to create Fujimichō. In 1933, the area along the Yasukuni Dōri Ave was renamed into Kudan. In 1938, the naming of the various districts of the area was shuffled. In 1966, Kudan was split in two, Kudankita north of the Yasukuni Dori ave, Kudanminami south of it.

The modern numbering of the six banchō bears little resemblance with the historical naming. As an example, Ichigaya station is located in modern Gobanchō, whereas the historical Gobanchō was around the location of the British Embassy.

== Districts ==
=== Modern Banchō ===
- Ichibanchō
- Nibanchō
- Sanbanchō
- Yonbanchō
- Gobanchō
- Rokubanchō

=== Historical Banchō ===
- Kudankita 2, 3 and 4-chome
- Kudanminami 2, 3 and 4-chome
- Fujimi

== Landmarks ==
- Yasukuni Shrine
- Chidorigafuchi National Cemetery
- Hosei University
- Otsuma Women's University
- British Embassy Tokyo

== See also ==
- Banchō Sarayashiki
