= Sanbanchō, Chiyoda, Tokyo =

Sanbanchō 三番町
- District
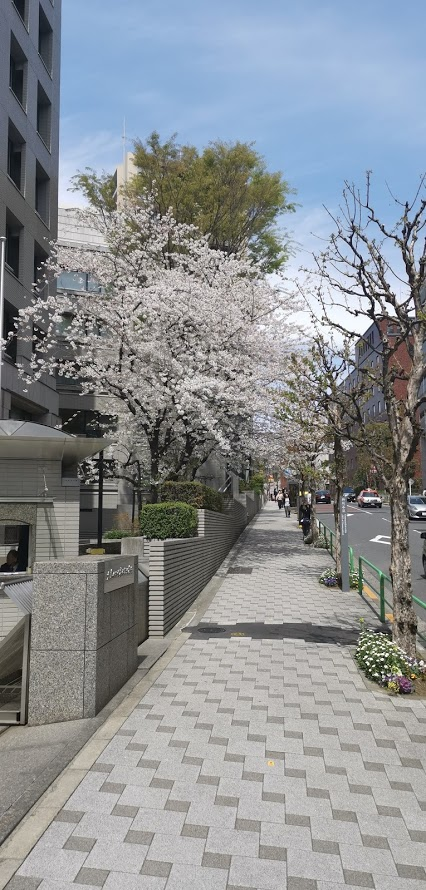
- Onmayadani slope, Sanbanchō, Chiyoda
- Interactive map of Sanbanchō
- Coordinates: 35°41′26.0″N 139°44′36.09″E
- Country: Japan
- City: Tokyo
- Ward: Chiyoda
- Area: Kōjimachi Area

Population (June 1, 2020)
  - Total: 3,666
- Time zone: UTC+9 (JST)
- Postal code: 102-0075
- Area code: 03

Part of the Banchō area, Sanbanchō (三番町) is an upscale, mostly residential district of Chiyoda, Tokyo, Japan. As of June 2020, the population of this district is 3,666 in 1,707 households. It borders the Tokyo Imperial Palace and the Chidorigafuchi moats to the east, Nibanchō and Yonbanchō to the west, Ichibanchō to the south, and Kudanminami to the north.

Like Yonbanchō, its official English spelling, Sanbanchō, does not follow the Hepburn romanization standard.

== History ==
Similarly to the rest of the Banchō area, Sanbanchō (三番町) was the site of residences of the Hatamoto soldiers in charge of guarding Edo Castle. Among those, the residence of Sano Masakoto (on present day site of Otsuma Women University), who became famous in 1784 by killing in the castle an unpopular government official.

In 1804, the Wagakukōdansho (和学講談所), (Institute of Lectures of Japanese classics), founded in 1793 and run by the blind scholar Hanawa Hokiichi was moved to Omote-Rokubancho, near nowadays Sanbancho-24. As the Shogunate was nearing its end, Omura Masujiro opened in 1856 Kyukyodo (鳩居堂), a rangaku institute in his residence, located next to nowadays Chidorigafuchi National Cemetery.

Tōgō Heihachirō moved to Banchō in 1881 and lived there for 54 years. The location of his residence is the Togo Gensui Memorial Park (東郷元帥記念公園).

The modern district was created on July 1, 1933, through a merger of the former districts of Ichibancho, Kami-Rokubancho and parts of Fujimicho 1-chome.

=== Kyōka ===
Sanbanchō was the subject of a famous Kyōka by Hanawa Hokiichi during Edo times.

| 番町に | Banchō ni | Banchō |
| 過ぎたるものは | Sugitaru mono ha | can be summed up by |
| 二つあり | Futatsu ari | two things |
| 佐野の桜と | Sano no sakura to | the cherry blossoms of Sano |
| 塙検校 | Hanawa Kengyō | and Hanawa the blind |

== Landmarks ==
- Chidorigafuchi National Cemetery
- Chidorigafuchi Green Way
- Otsuma Women University
- Otsuma Junior and Senior Highschool
- Kudan Elementary School and Kindergarten
- Apostolic Nunciature
- Kudan campus of the Nishogakusha University
- Tokyo Kasei-Gakuin University
- Tokyo Kasei-Gakuin Junior and Senior Highschool
- All-Japan Band Association
- Togo Gensui Memorial Park

== Education ==
Chiyoda Board of Education operates public elementary and junior high schools. Kudan Elementary School (九段小学校) is the zoned elementary school for Sanbanchō. There is a freedom of choice system for junior high schools in Chiyoda Ward, and so there are no specific junior high school zones.
