= Japan–Luxembourg relations =

- Japan: Luxembourg

Japan–Luxembourg relations refers to the bilateral relations between Japan and Luxembourg. Both nations are members of the Organisation for Economic Co-operation and Development.

== History ==
On 27 November 1927, Japan and Luxembourg established diplomatic relations. However, during World War II, Japan was formally in a state of war with Luxembourg because the Luxembourg government-in-exile, led by Grand Duchess Charlotte and Prime Minister Pierre Dupong, sided with the Allied Powers against Nazi Germany, with whom the Empire of Japan was allied.

Following the end of the war and the entry into force of the Treaty of San Francisco on 28 April 1952, which restored Japan's sovereignty, diplomatic relations were officially resumed on 10 March 1953, through an exchange of notes between the two nations.

In 1973, the Industrial Bank of Japan (now Mizuho Bank) became the first Japanese bank to establish a local subsidiary in Luxembourg. The Embassy of Luxembourg was opened in Nibancho, Chiyoda-ku, Tokyo, in March 1987. A tax treaty aimed at avoiding double taxation and preventing tax evasion regarding income and certain other taxes entered into force on 27 December 1992. In January 1996, the Embassy of Japan was established in Luxembourg. In April 2003, the Luxembourg Embassy in Tokyo moved to its current location in Yonbancho, Chiyoda-ku.

== High-level visits ==
Prime Ministerial visits from Japan to Luxembourg

- Shinzo Abe (2015)

Prime Ministerial visits from Luxembourg to Japan

- Jean-Claude Juncker (1997, 2008, 2010, 2012)
- Xavier Bettel (2015, 2022)
- Luc Frieden (2025)

== Resident diplomatic missions ==
- Luxembourg has an embassy in Tokyo.
- Japan has an embassy in Luxembourg City.

== See also ==
- Foreign relations of Japan
- Foreign relations of Luxembourg
