= Sano Masakoto =

Japanese samurai

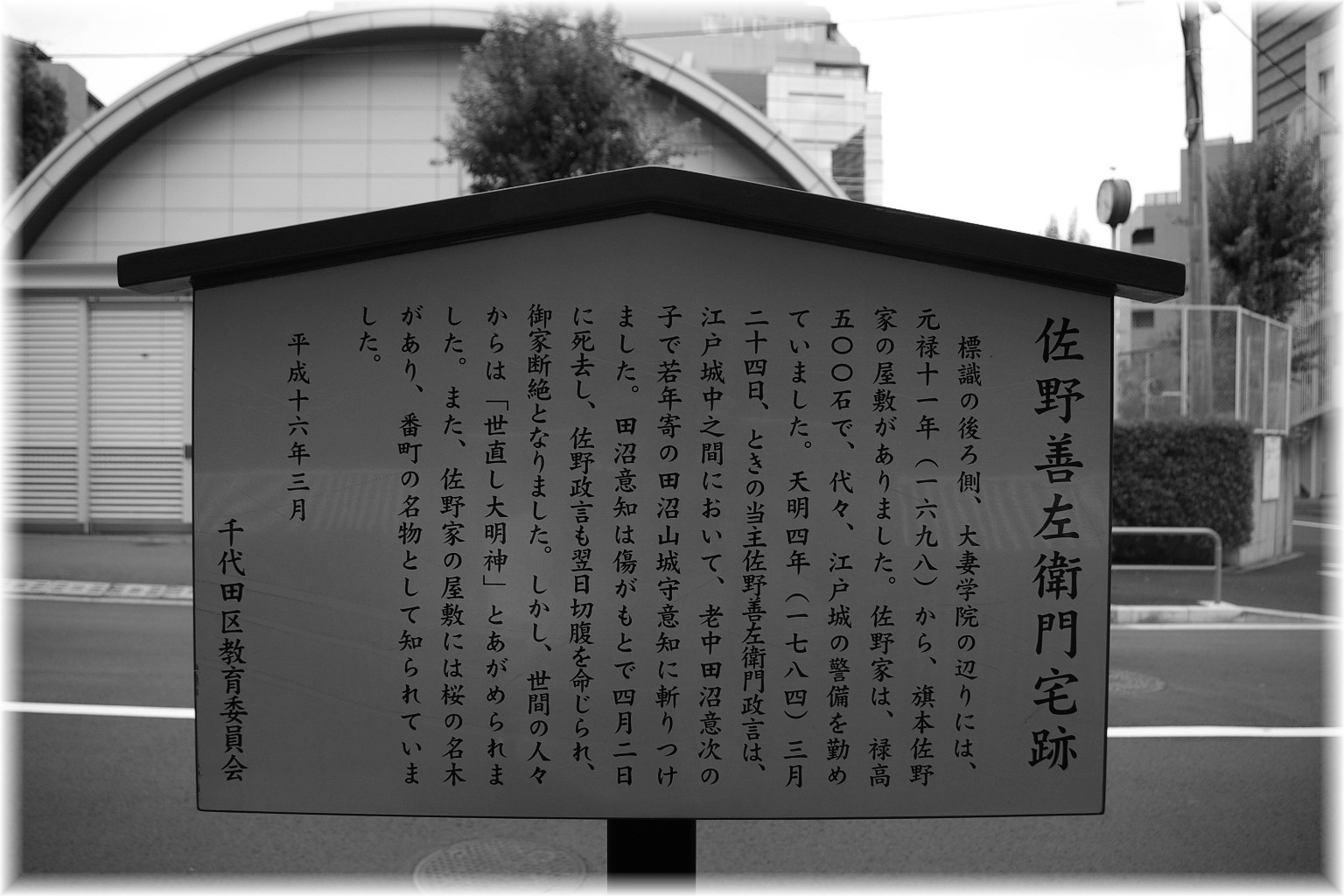
Site of home of Sano Zenzaemon (Sanbanchō).

Sano Masakoto (佐野 政言, 1757 – 1784), nicknamed Sano Zenzaemon (佐野善左衛門) was a Japanese samurai, a hatamoto guard of Edo Castle, who gained his fame by killing the unpopular wakadoshiyori Tanuma Okitomo in March 1784 in the castle.

== History ==
On March 24, 1784, in Edo castle, Sano shouted three times "remember", Oboegaaro (覚えがあろう) to Tanuma Okitomo and cut him with a wakizashi. Tanuma died of his wounds eight days later, and Sano was condemned to commit seppuku. The Sano clan was punished, but as Sano was the only male heir to the clan, the estate of the family went back to the father. The exact motive of Sano remains unclear and there are several competing theories, but the shogunate put his actions on a moment of madness. Sano's tomb is in Tokuhonji, near Asakusa.

=== Post-death celebration ===
Tanuma and his father, Tanuma Okitsugu, were unpopular; furthermore, the country had just been through a famine caused by the Mount Asama eruption, and coincidently just after the killing, the price of rice started to fall. This sudden shift was put on Sano's actions, who was deified as Yonaoshi Daimyojin (世直し大明神, great patron of world renewal). Tokuhonji became a site for his celebration.

The campus of Otsuka Women's University in Sanbanchō is on the site of his residence, which is marked by a touristic sign.
