= Kotaka =

Kotaka may refer to:

== Ships ==
- Japanese gunboat Kotaka, a river gunboat of the Imperial Japanese Navy
- Japanese torpedo boat Kotaka, a torpedo boat of the Imperial Japanese Navy

== People with the given name ==
- Kotaka Otsuma (大妻 コタカ; 1884–1970), Japanese educator

== People with the surname ==
- George Kotaka (born 1977), American kareteka
- Masahiro Kotaka (小高 正宏; born 1960), Japanese weightlifter
