= Ichibanchō, Chiyoda, Tokyo =

District of Chiyoda, Tokyo, Japan

Ichibanchō (一番町), part of the Bancho area, is an upscale residential district of Chiyoda, Tokyo, Japan. The district is located just west of Tokyo Imperial Palace, and is home to the British Embassy and Paraguayan Embassy. It is also home to the Hanzomon Museum.

The district borders Chiyoda (Tokyo Imperial Palace) on the east, Sanbanchō and Yonbanchō on the north, Nibanchō on the west, and Kōjimachi on the south.

== Education ==
Chiyoda Board of Education operates public elementary and junior high schools. Kōjimachi Elementary School (千代田区立麹町小学校) is the zoned elementary school for Ichibanchō. There is a freedom of choice system for junior high schools in Chiyoda Ward, and so there are no specific junior high school zones.

Joshigakuin Junior and Senior High School is a private secondary school and the only educational institution based in Ichibanchō.
