= Kudanminami =

District of Chiyoda, Tokyo

Kudanminami (九段南) is a district of Chiyoda, Tokyo, Japan, consisting of 1-chōme to 4-chōme. As of March 1, 2007, its population is 2,431.

Kudanminami is located on the northwestern part of the Chiyoda ward. The Nihonbashi River and Yasukuni-dōri Ave form its eastern and northern boundaries, respectively. It borders Kanda-Jinbōchō to the east, Gobanchō to the west, Sanbanchō, Hitotsubashi and Yonbanchō to the south, and Kudankita to the north. In addition, it borders Kitanomaru Kōen between its 1-chōme and 2-chōme. The zone is a prestigious business and residential zone.

== District ==
=== Kudanminami 1-chōme ===
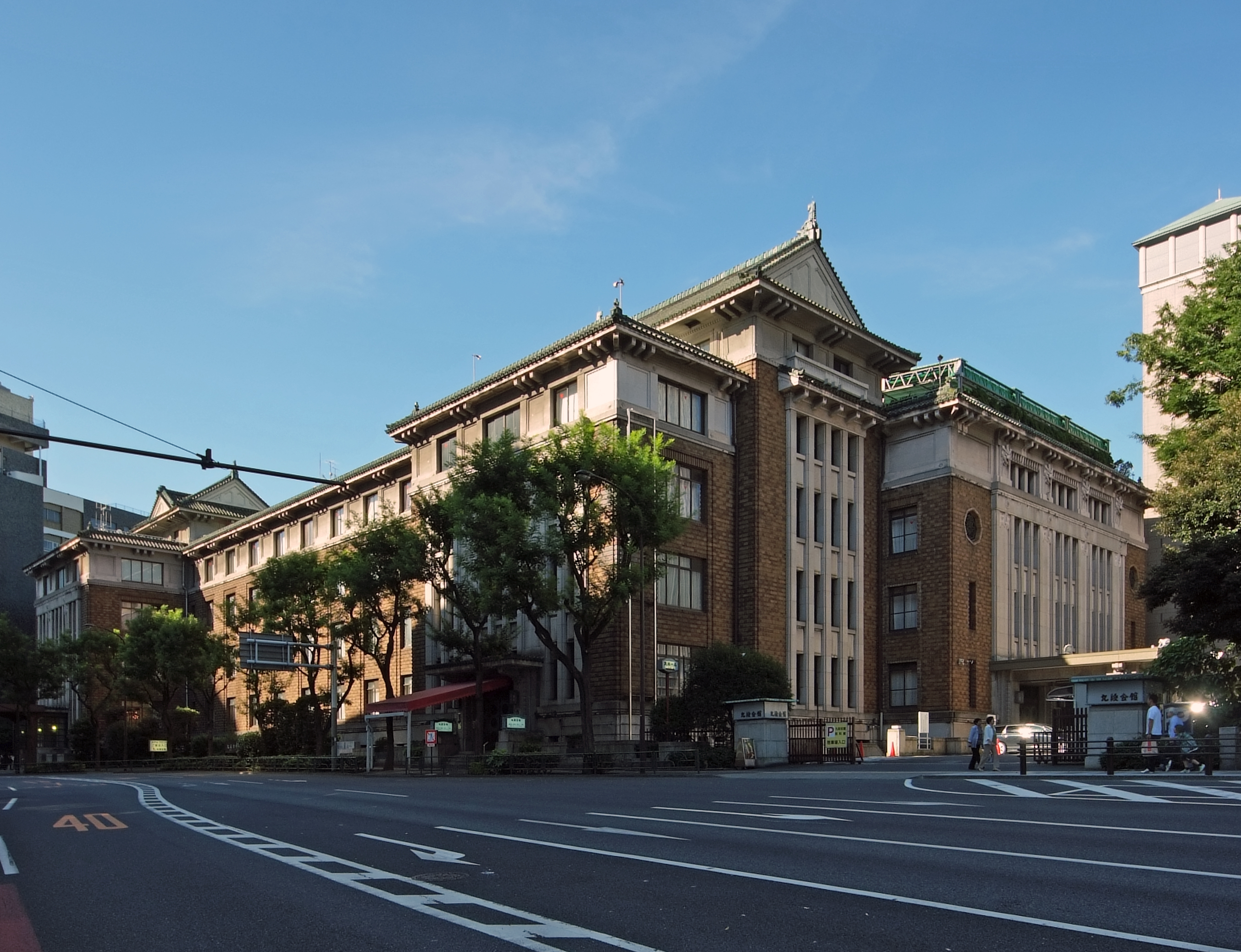
Kudan Kaikan

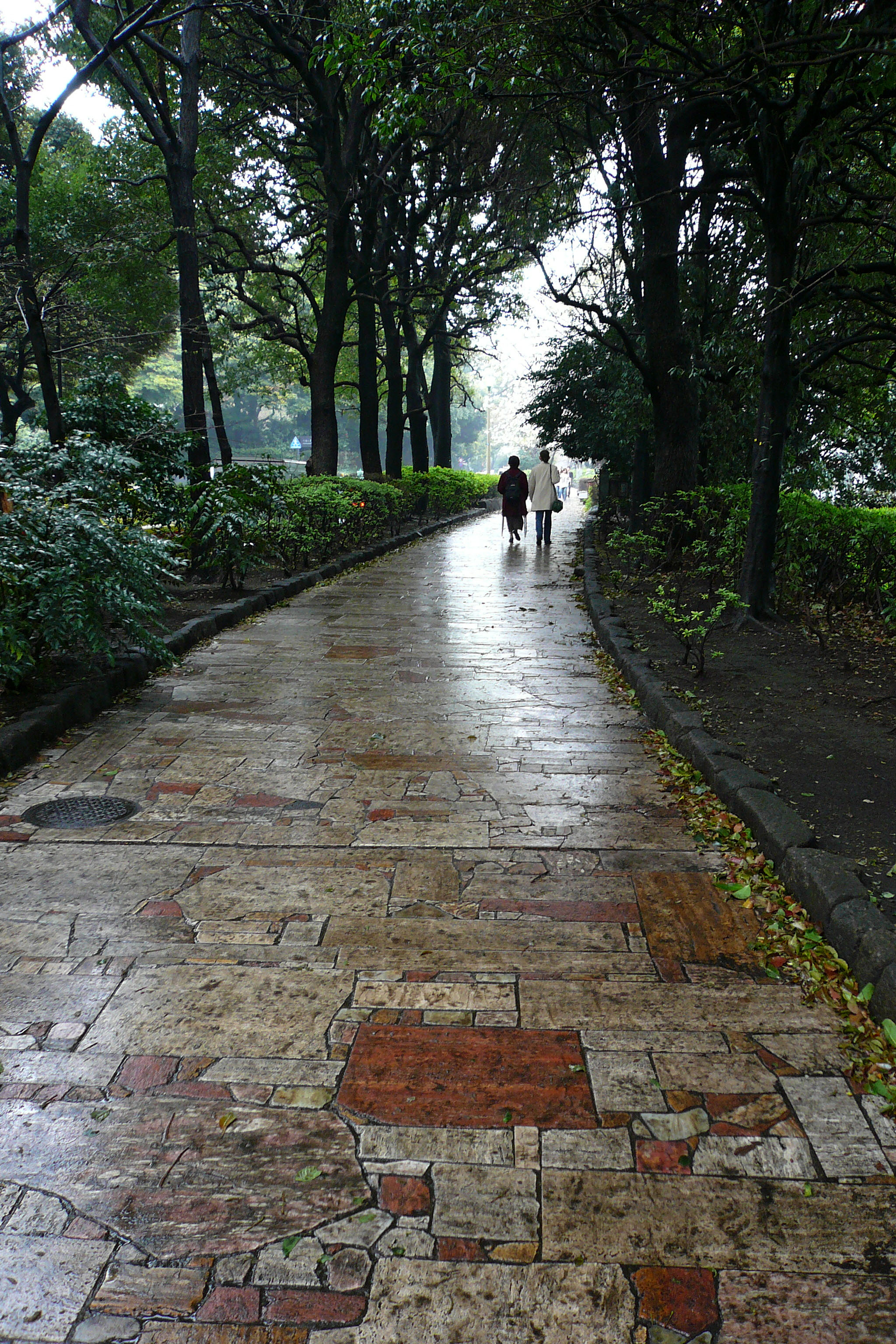
Chidorigafuchi Moat Path

Kudanminami 1-chōme is situated on the easternmost part of the Kudanminami district. The Nishinomaru Park is situated to the west. This subdistrict is home to a number of office buildings, facilities, and public institutions.

- Chiyoda Ward Office
- Chiyoda Kaikan
- Kudan Kaikan
- Kudan Common Government Office Building
- Kudan Common Government Office Building No.2 (Tokyo Legal Affairs Bureau)
- Kudan Common Government Office Building No.3
- Aozora Bank Head Office
- Kudan Social Education Center
- Kudan Post Office
- Japan War-Bereaved Families Association headquarters

Kudanminami 2, 3 and 4 are part of the Banchō area.

=== Kudanminami 2-chōme ===
The Nishinomaru Park is situated to the east. Kudanminami 3-chōme is situated to the west.

- Embassy of India
- Kudanzaka Hospital
- High School attached to Nishogakusha University
- Branch Government Office of the Ministry of Agriculture, Forestry and Fisheries
- Chidorigafuchi Moat Path

=== Kudanminami 3-chōme ===
This subdistrict is situated on the west of Kudanminami.

=== Kudanminami 4-chōme ===
This subdistrict is situated on the westernmost part of Kudanminami, bordering its 3-chōme to the east and Gobanchō to the west.

- Main branch of Nihon University
- Kōjimachi Post Office

== Education ==
Chiyoda Board of Education operates public elementary and junior high schools. Fujimi Elementary School (富士見小学校) is the zoned elementary school for Kudanminami 1-chōme while Kudan Elementary School (千代田区立九段小学校) is the zoned elementary school for Kudanminami 2-4 chōme. There is a freedom of choice system for junior high schools in Chiyoda Ward, and so there are no specific junior high school zones.
