= Kudankita =

District of Chiyoda, Tokyo, Japan

Coordinates: 35.6939°N 139.7408°E

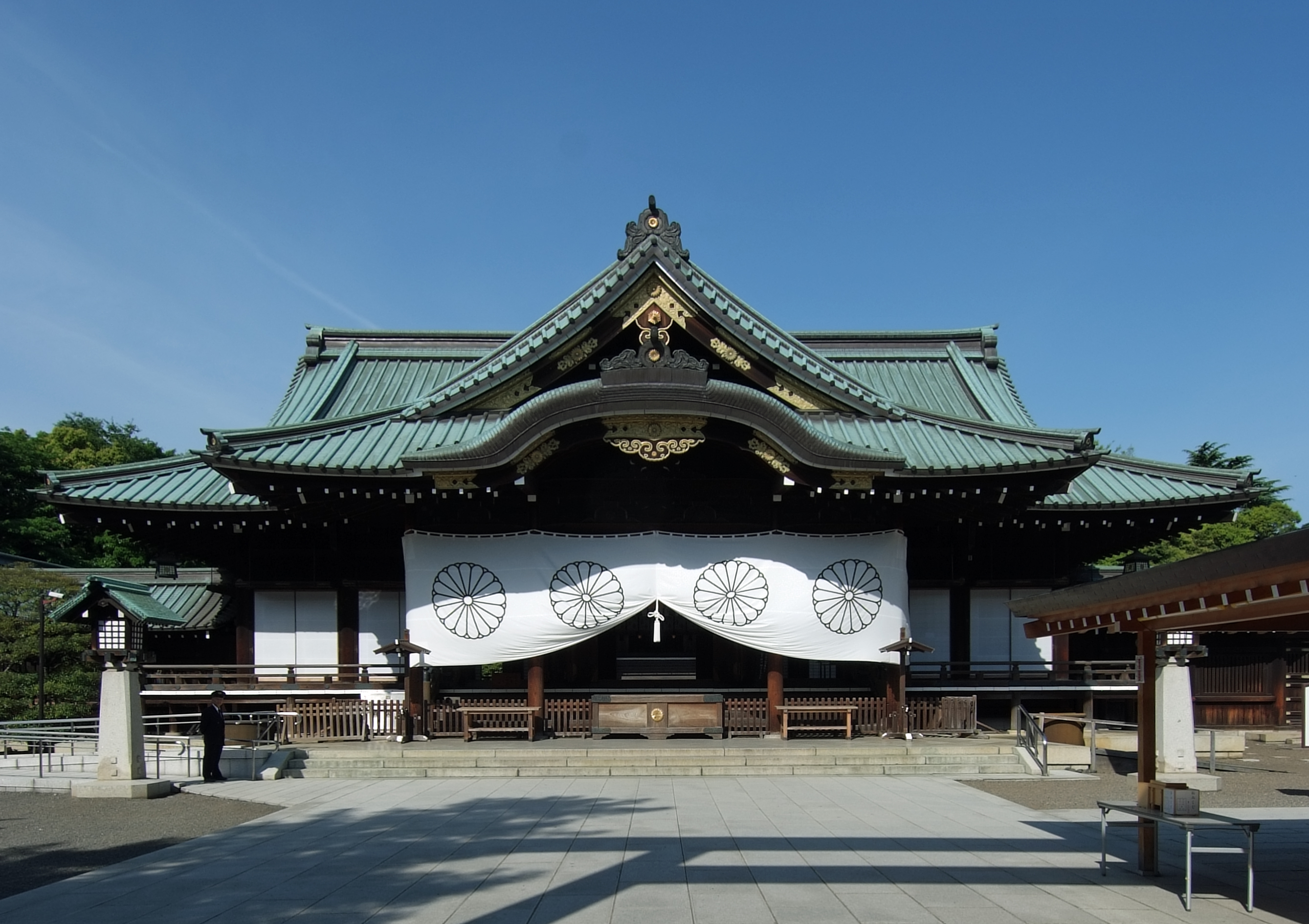
Inner Shrine, Yasukuni Shrine

Kudankita (九段北) is a district of Chiyoda, Tokyo, Japan, consisting of four chōme. It was a part of the former ward of Kōjimachi. As of March 1, 2007, its population is 1,404. Kudankita is a luxury and prestigious residential and business zone.

The Yasukuni Shrine is situated near the center of the district.

The Kudanshita district is located on the northwestern part of the ward of Chiyoda and borders Ichigayatamachi, Shinjuku. It also borders Nishi-Kanda and Kanda-Jinbōchō to the east, Kudanminami and Kitanomaru Kōen to the south, and Fujimi and Iidabashi to the north.

== Economy ==
Tecmo had its headquarters in Kudankita. The construction company, Nakano Corporation, is also headquartered in the district.

== District ==
=== Kudankita 1-chōme ===
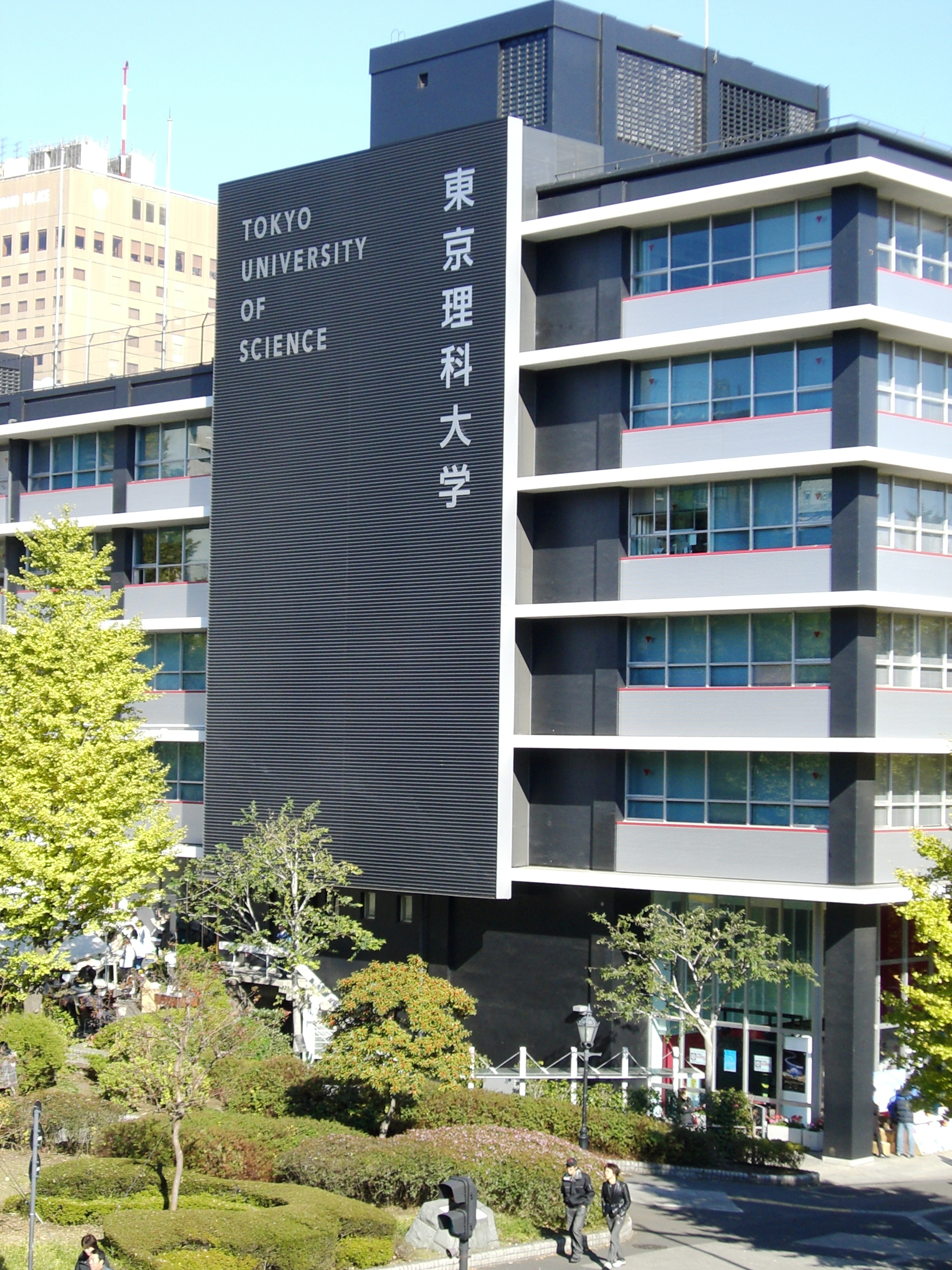
Tokyo University of Science Kudan Campus

- Wako Kudan Junior & Senior High School
- Tokyo University of Science Kudan Campus
- Kitanomaru Square
- Jissen Rinri Kōseikai
- The Japan Society of Applied Physics

Kudanminami 2, 3 and 4 are part of the Banchō area.

=== Kudankita 2-chōme ===
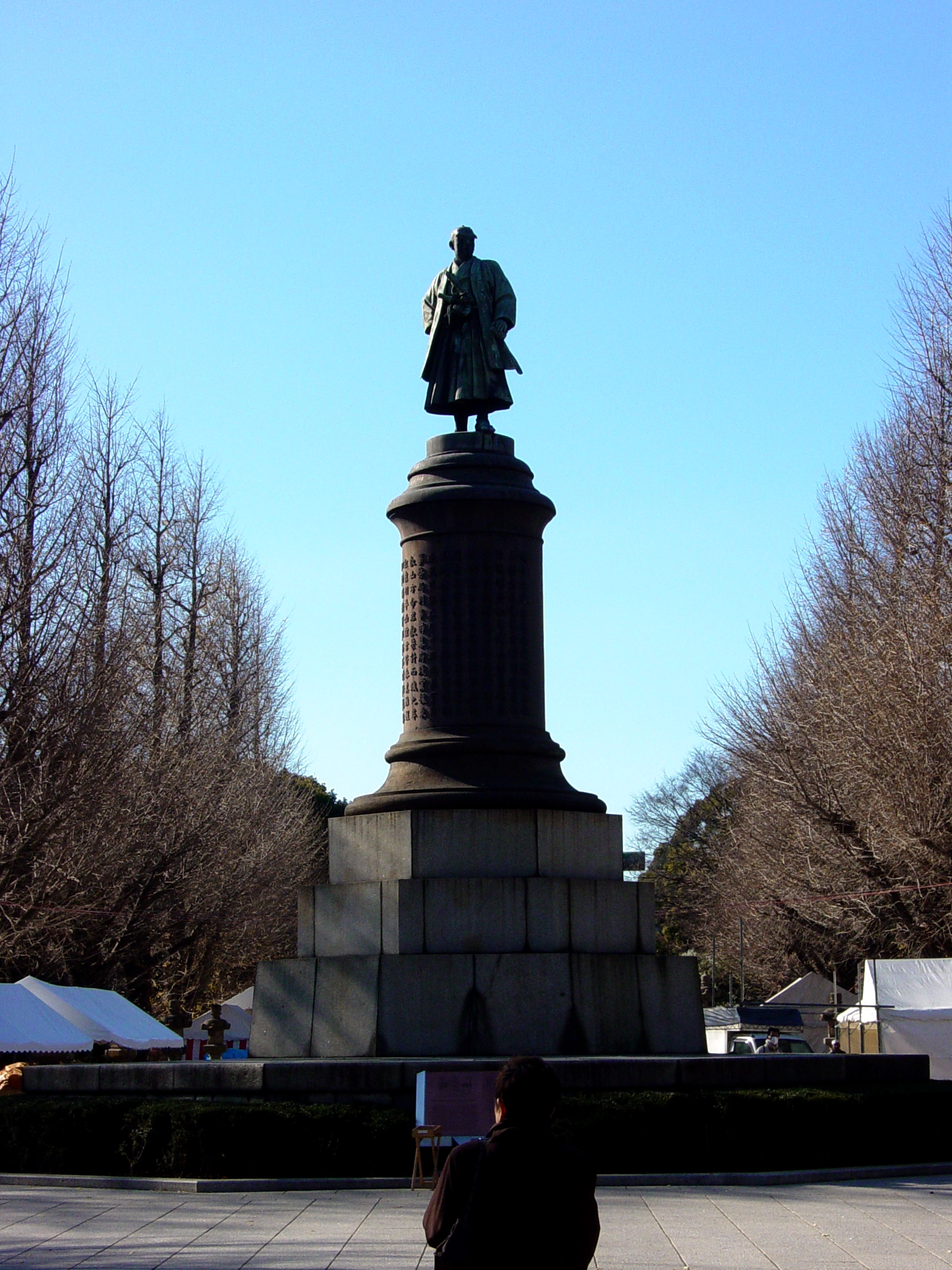
Statue of Ōmura Masujirō, Yasukuni Shrine

- Yasukuni Shrine
- Tokyo Metropolitan Kudan Senior High School
- Shirayuri Gakuen
- Katsuo Maguro Kaikan

=== Kudankita 3-chōme ===
- Yasukuni Shrine
- Miwada Gakuen
- Hosei University

=== Kudankita 4-chōme ===
- Sekai Bunka Publishing
- Sotobori Kōen

== Education ==
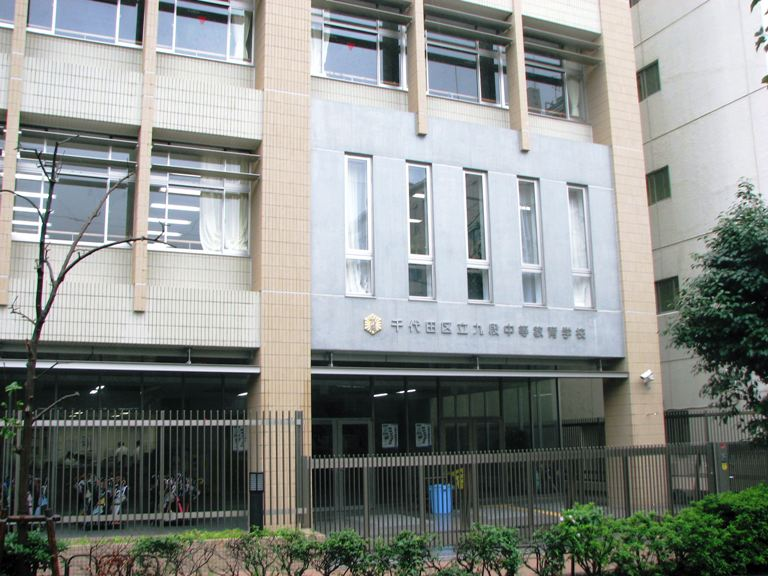
Kudan Secondary School

Chiyoda Board of Education operates public elementary and junior high schools. Fujimi Elementary School (富士見小学校) is the zoned elementary school for Kudankita 1-2 chōme while Kudan Elementary School (千代田区立九段小学校) is the zoned elementary school for Kudankita 3-4 chōme. There is a freedom of choice system for junior high schools in Chiyoda Ward, and so there are no specific junior high school zones.

Chiyoda Ward operates Kudan Secondary School, a junior-senior high school, in Kudankita.
