= Beatrice Bodart-Bailey =

Australian academic, writer, Japanologist (born 1942)

Beatrice Bodart-Bailey (born 1942) is an Australian academic, writer, and Japanologist. She was named professor of economics at Kobe University, becoming "the first female and first non-Japanese person actually appointed by the Ministry of Education".

== Biography ==
Bodart-Bailey's early education was in German and British schools. She earned a BA at the Australian National University (ANU). Her master's and doctorate degrees were awarded at the Research School of Pacific and Asian Studies (RSPAS) at ANU in Canberra.

Her MA thesis investigated "The Political Significance of the Tea Master Sen no Rikyū (1522–1591)". Her 1980 Ph.D. thesis examined "Yanagisawa Yoshiyasu (1658-1714)".

Bodart-Bailey's marriage to an Australian diplomat caused Bodart-Bailey to follow him as his career developed, including postings in Bangkok, Thailand, and Ottawa, Canada.

In 1982–1986, Bodart-Bailey was a visiting professor at Ottawa University, teaching Japanese history. She returned to ANU for post-graduate studies.

Between 1986 and 1995, Bodart-Bailey was granted various research fellowships at ANU.

In 1989–1990, Bodart-Bailey was awarded a Japan Foundation Fellow at the Institute of Social Science, University of Tokyo. She has been a professor in the International Research Center for Japanese Studies, Kyoto, and at Kobe University.

In 1991, Bodart-Bailey became professor of Japanese history at Otsuma Women's University, where she was a founding member of the Department of Comparative Culture.

== Selected works ==
In a statistical overview derived from writings by and about Beatrice Bodart Bailey, OCLC/WorldCat encompasses roughly 30+ works in 30+ publications in 2 languages and 170+ library holdings.

- Tea and Counsel, the Political Role of Sen Rikyū (1977)
- Yanagisawa Yoshiyasu: a Reappraisal (1980)
- Kaempfer Restored (1988)
- Tokugawa Tsunayoshi (1646-1709): a Weberian analysis (1989)
- A case of political and economic expropriation : the monetary reform of the fifth Tokugawa shogun (1989)
- Engelbart Kämpfer (1990)
- Japanese: 遙かなる目的地: ケンペルと德川日本の出会い (1999)
- The Most Magnificent Monastery and Other Famous Sights: the Japanese Paintings of Engelbert Kaempfer (1992)
- The Persecution of Confucianism in Early Tokugawa Japan (1993)
- Japanese: ケンペルと德川綱吉: ドイツ人医師と将軍との交流 (1994)
- The Furthest Goal: Engelbert Kaempfer's Encounter with Tokugawa Japan (1995)
- Kaempfer's Japan: Tokugawa Culture Observed (1999)
- The Dog Shogun: the Personality and Policies of Tokugawa Tsunayoshi (2006)
- Japanese: ケンペル: 礼節の国に来たりて (2009)
