= Nibanchō, Chiyoda, Tokyo =

Nibanchō 二番町
- District
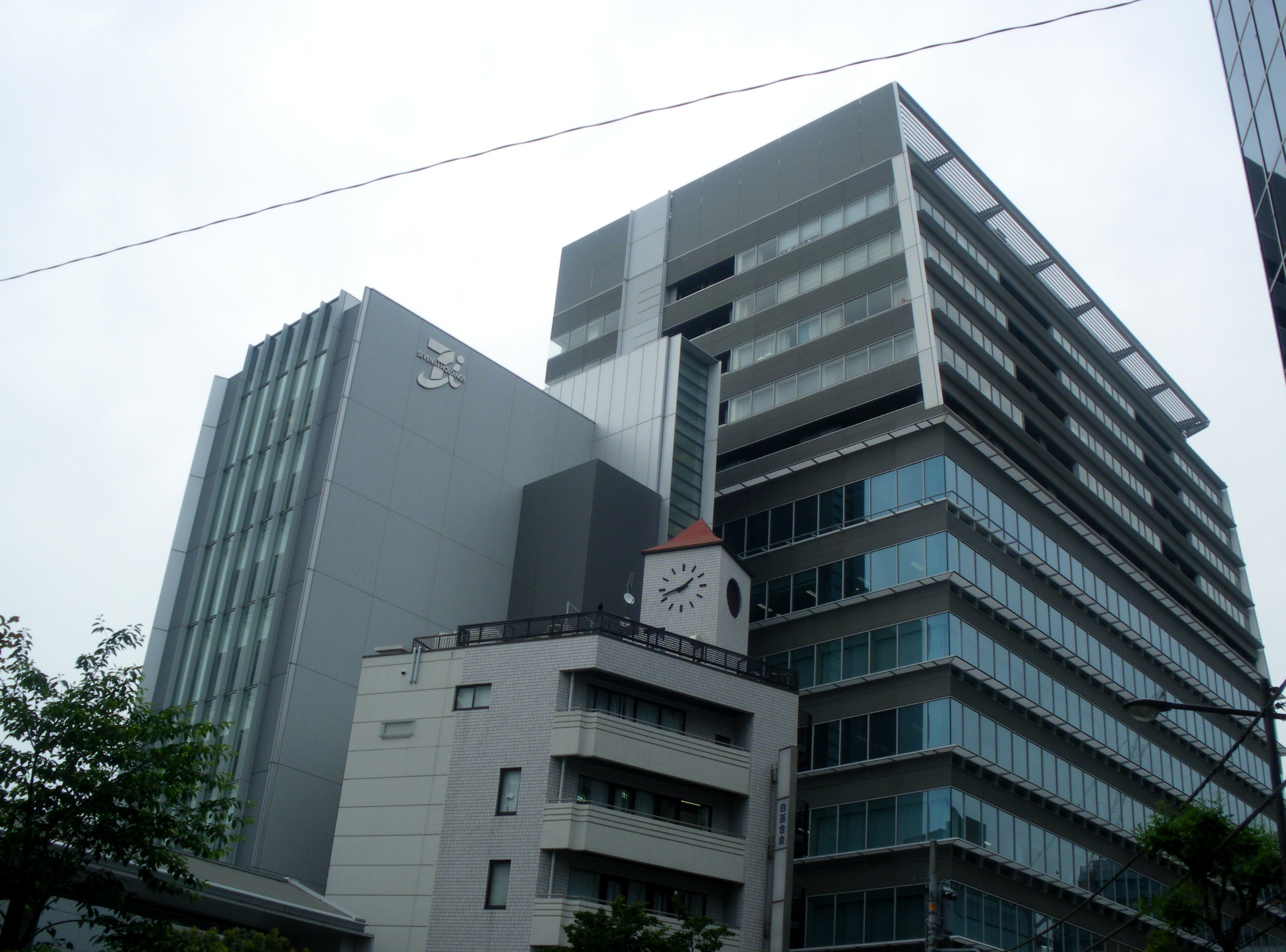
- Seven and i holdings head office in Nibancho
- Interactive map of Nibanchō
- Coordinates: 35°41′9.91″N 139°44′4.61″E
- Country: Japan
- City: Tokyo
- Ward: Chiyoda
- Area: Kōjimachi Area

Population (June 1, 2020)
  - Total: 1,807
- Time zone: UTC+9 (JST)
- Postal code: 102-0084
- Area code: 03

Part of the Banchō area, Nibanchō (二番町) is an upscale, mostly residential district of Chiyoda, Tokyo, Japan. As of June 2020, the population of this district is 1,538 in 730 households. It borders Ichibanchō East, Kojimachi to the west and south, Rokubanchō and Yonbanchō the north.

It was renamed from Shimo-Nibancho on August 1, 1938.

It is home to the Belgian Embassy and Israeli Embassy. Globis University Graduate School of Management is a private university based in Nibanchō.

== Education ==
Chiyoda Board of Education operates public elementary and junior high schools. Kōjimachi Elementary School (千代田区立麹町小学校) is the zoned elementary school for Nibanchō 1, 3, 5, 9, and 11-chōme while Banchō Elementary School (千代田区立番町小学校) is the zoned elementary school for Nibanchō 2, 4, 6-8, 10, 12, and 14-chōme. There is a freedom of choice system for junior high schools in Chiyoda Ward, and so there are no specific junior high school zones.
