= Japan War-Bereaved Families Association =

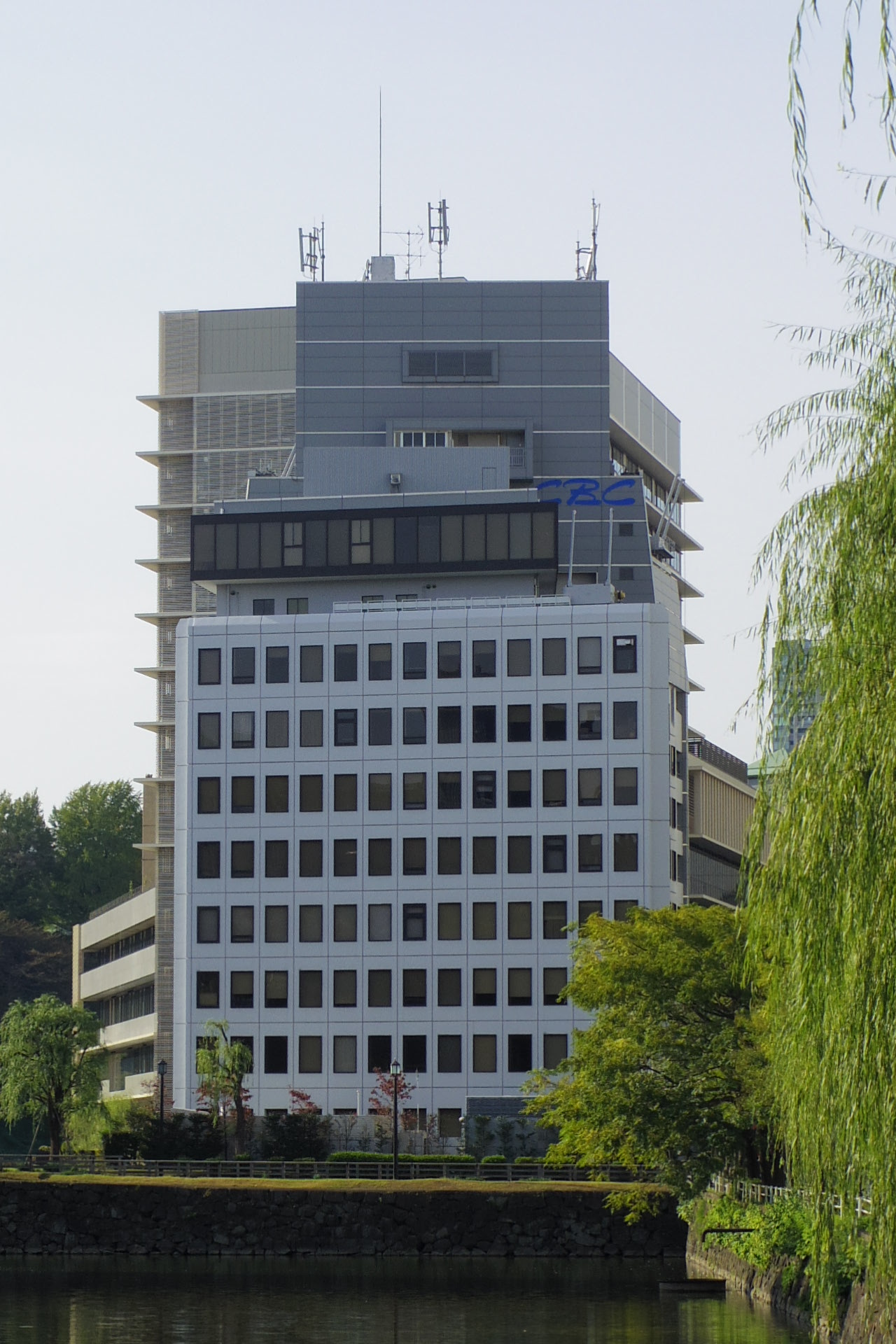
CBC Chiyoda Kaikan Building, where the Tokyo branch office of the association is based.

The Japan War-Bereaved Families Association (日本遺族会, nippon izokukai) is an association in Japan that was set up to represent the interests of relatives of deceased war veterans in the Second World War. Its headquarters are in Kudanminami, Tokyo. The group supports visits to Yasukuni Shrine in Tokyo to pay respects to Japan's war dead.

The Japanese War-Bereaved Families Association has extremely close ties with Japan’s Liberal Democratic Party. The Japanese War-Bereaved Families Association was originally called the Japan Bereaved Family-Welfare Federation and founded in 1947. The organization gained traction through its grassroots efforts gathering the remains of Japanese soldiers throughout Japan throughout the 1970s. As the JWBFA organized and carried out these efforts, it gained the support of the Japanese public, which in turn gave it greater influence. It used this influence on the political party in power, the Liberal Democratic Party, to further their goal of remembering those who lost their lives in service to Japan during the Second World War.

The relationship between the two organizations deepened as it became more beneficial to each party. The JWBFA was able to continue supporting the families it was established to aid, while the LDP gained political support in the form of additional voters. Eventually, after a bill to support Yasukuni Shrine failed four times, a separate agreement was reached. This deal involved the establishment of a tradition whereby the prime minister would privately visit Yasukuni Shrine on August 15 each year, the anniversary of the end of World War II. This began in 1975, and in 1978 the agreement was expanded to allow the prime minister to travel to the shrine using government vehicles and be accompanied by cabinet ministers. The addition of Class-A war criminals to the shrine in 1978 divided the JWBFA, and several of its chapters along with Emperor Shōwa severed ties with the organization. In response, a new agreement between the JWBFA and the LDP was established: the prime minister would now make official visits, forcing Japan to recognize Yasukuni Shrine as a commemorative site for the first time.

In 2014 the Fukuoka Prefecture chapter of the association called for the A-class war criminals enshrined at Yasukuni Shrine to be removed to make the site less controversial. The statement stated that the chapter “hopes that the emperor and empress, as well as the prime minister and all other Japanese nationals, will be able to pay their respects at Yasukuni without reserve”.

== Political Value ==
One main political value that is held by JWBFA is to make it a mandate for high ranking Japanese official to visit and pay respect to Yasukuni Shrine and some of the WWII criminals that are enshrined inside it.
