= Gobanchō, Chiyoda, Tokyo =

Gobanchō 五番町
- District
- Interactive map of Gobanchō
- Coordinates: 35°41′24.62″N 139°44′7.31″E
- Country: Japan
- City: Tokyo
- Ward: Chiyoda
- Area: Kōjimachi Area

Population (June 1, 2020)
  - Total: 971
- Time zone: UTC+9 (JST)
- Postal code: 102-0081
- Area code: 03

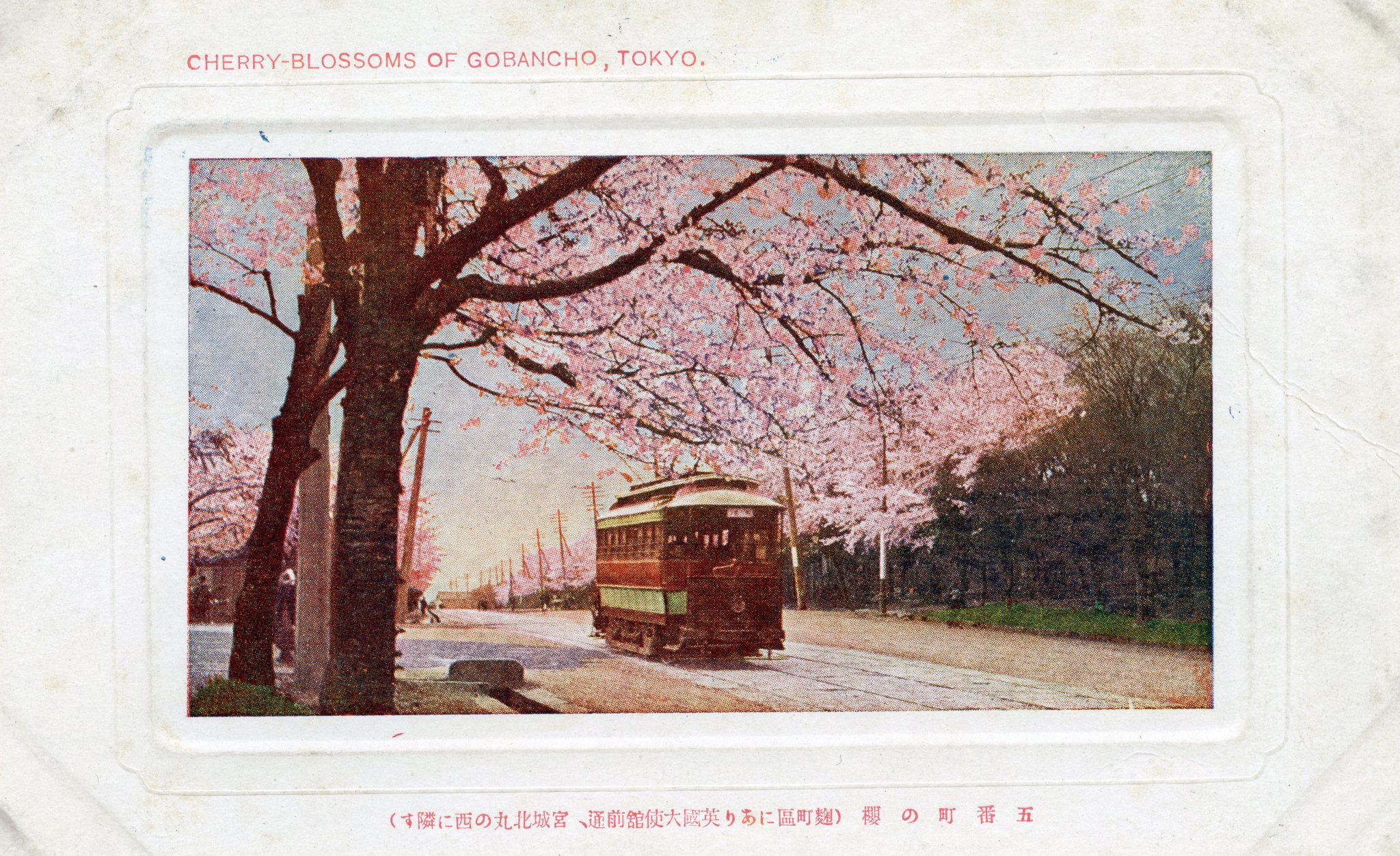
Cherry Blossoms of Gobancho, Tokyo

Part of the Banchō area, Gobanchō (五番町) is an upscale, mostly residential district of Chiyoda, Tokyo, Japan. As of June 2020, the population of this district is 971 in 439 households.

== Education ==
The Chiyoda Board of Education operates public elementary and junior high schools. Bancho Elementary School (番町小学校) is the zoned elementary of Gobanchō. There is a freedom of choice system for junior high schools in Chiyoda Ward, and so there are no specific junior high school zones.
