= Chidorigafuchi National Cemetery =

Cemetery and memorial in Tokyo, Japan

Coordinates: 35°41′24″N 139°44′49″E

千鳥ケ淵戦没者墓苑
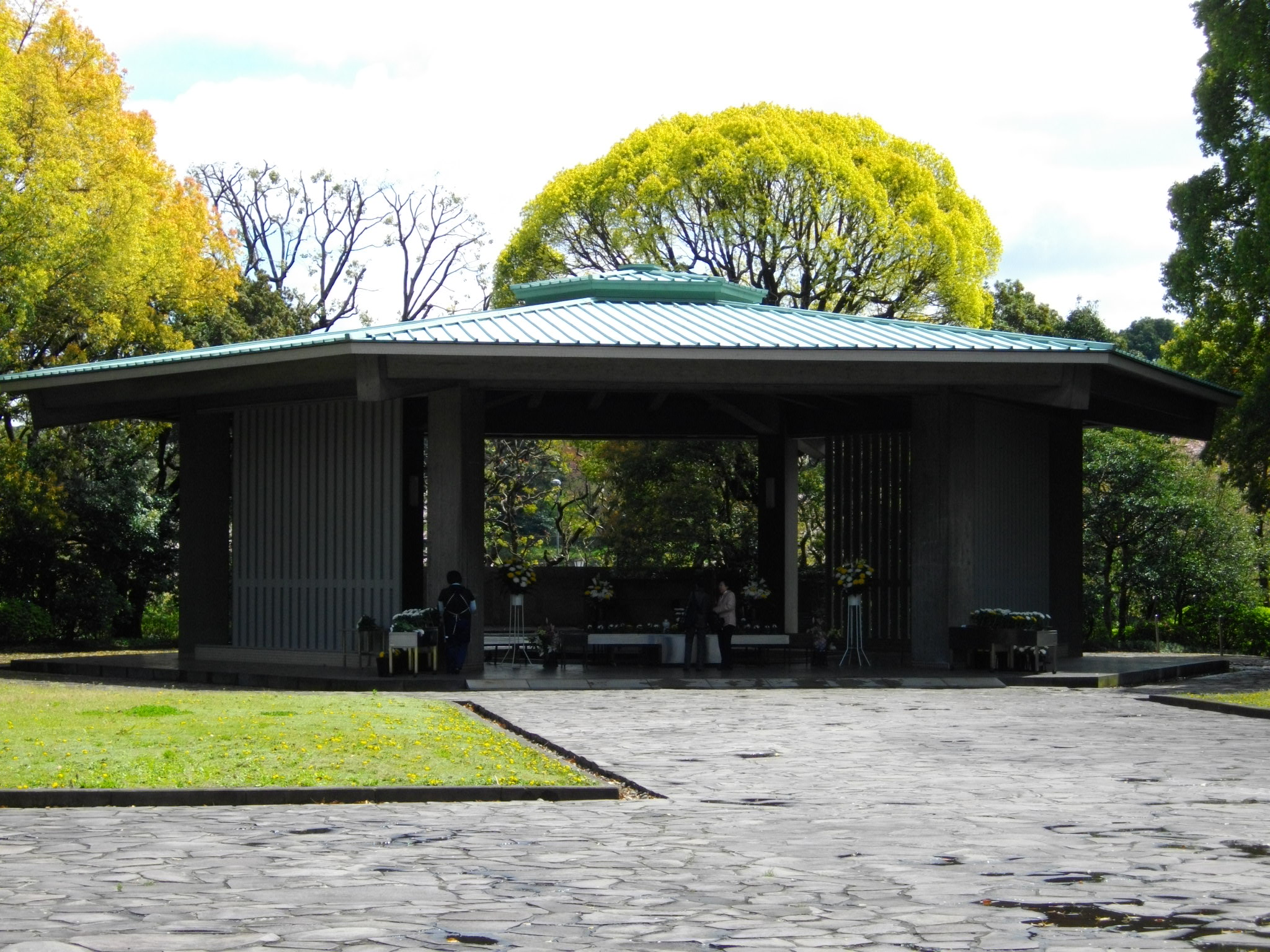
- Rokkaku-dō in the Chidorigafuchi National Cemetery
- Interactive map of 千鳥ケ淵戦没者墓苑

Details
- Established: 1959
- Location: Sanbanchō, Chiyoda Ward, Tōkyō Metropolis
- Country: Japan
- Type: public
- Owned by: Ministry of the Environment
- Size: 16,063 m^{2} (172,900 sq ft)
- No. of graves: 358,260
- Website: 千鳥ケ淵戦没者墓苑[環境省]

Chidorigafuchi National Cemetery (千鳥ケ淵戦没者墓苑, Chidorigafuchi Senbotsusha Boen) is a national Japanese cemetery and memorial for 352,297 unidentified war dead of the Second World War, located near the inner moat of the Imperial Palace and Yasukuni Shrine in Tokyo, Japan.

== Overview ==
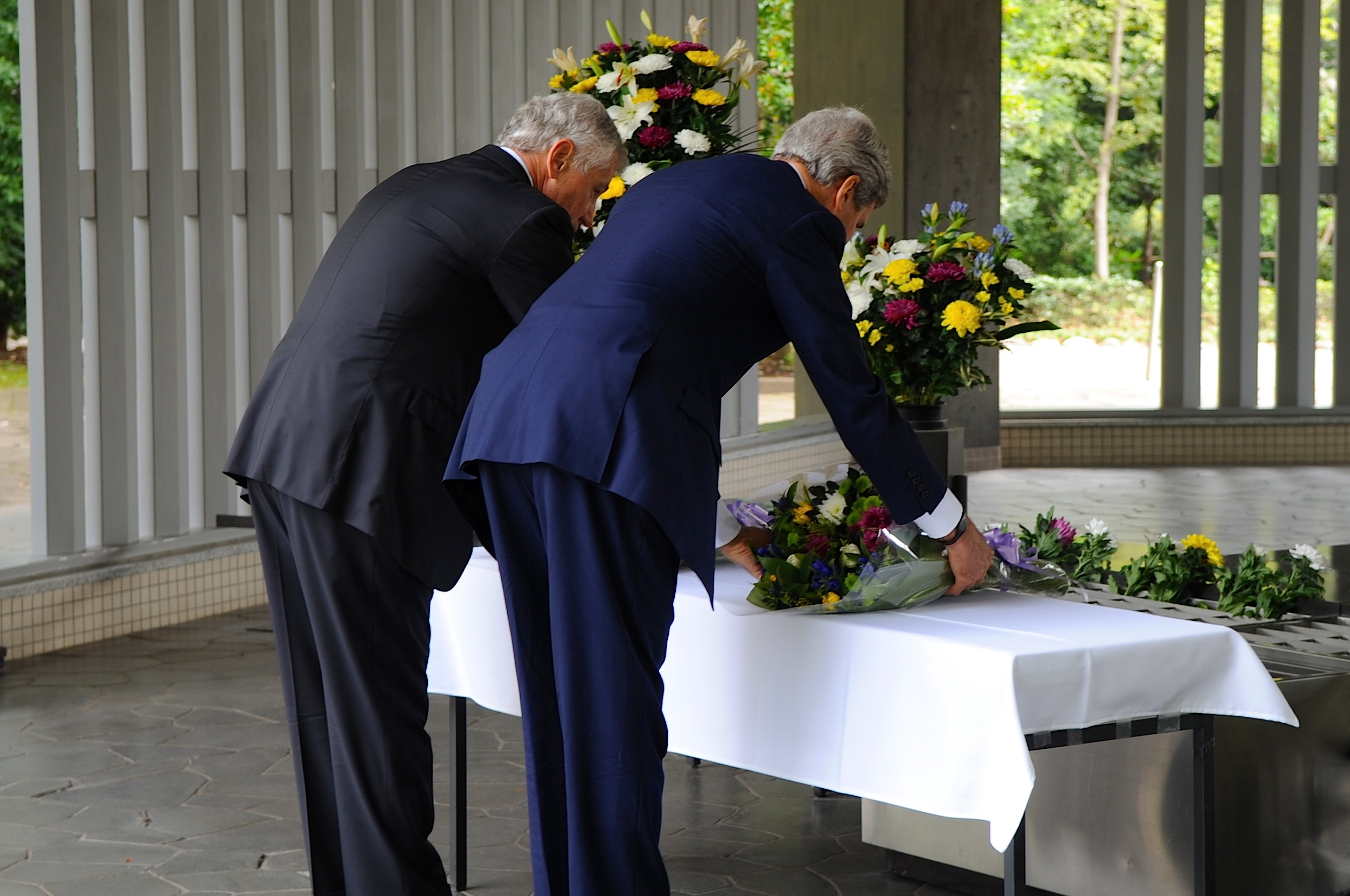
U.S. Secretary of Defense Chuck Hagel and U.S. Secretary of State John Kerry lay wreaths (October 3, 2013)

The recovery of remains from the Pacific War presented an unprecedented problem for the Japanese government, as some soldiers could not be identified due to harsh battlefield conditions, and the families of others had perished in the extensive air raids on Japan and atomic bombings of Hiroshima and Nagasaki. In 1952, the recovery committee began storing human remains in the offices of the Ministry of Welfare while it sought a more permanent structure to house and honor the dead. In 1953 the Cabinet of the Prime Minister ordered a "tomb of the unknown soldier" constructed, the site was purchased in 1956, and it was completed in March 1959. It is a public institution and is infrequently visited by the Emperor and Prime Minister.

The cemetery is sometimes mentioned in connection with the Yasukuni Shrine debate, but Chidorigafuchi serves a separate purpose. The cemetery houses the actual remains of unidentified soldiers, in place of the usual family grave. Yasukuni Shrine is a privately run facility which honors not only unidentified soldiers from the Pacific War but all people who died for the sake of the country. However, in 2006 a Liberal Democratic Party leader proposed that the cemetery be expanded so that it might honor all war dead in a way akin to Arlington National Cemetery.

== Notable burials ==
- Tadayoshi Koga

== See also ==
- List of national cemeteries by country
- Japanese cemeteries and cenotaphs
