= Chiyoda International School Tokyo =

Chiyoda International School Tokyo Japanese: 千代田インターナショナルスクール東京
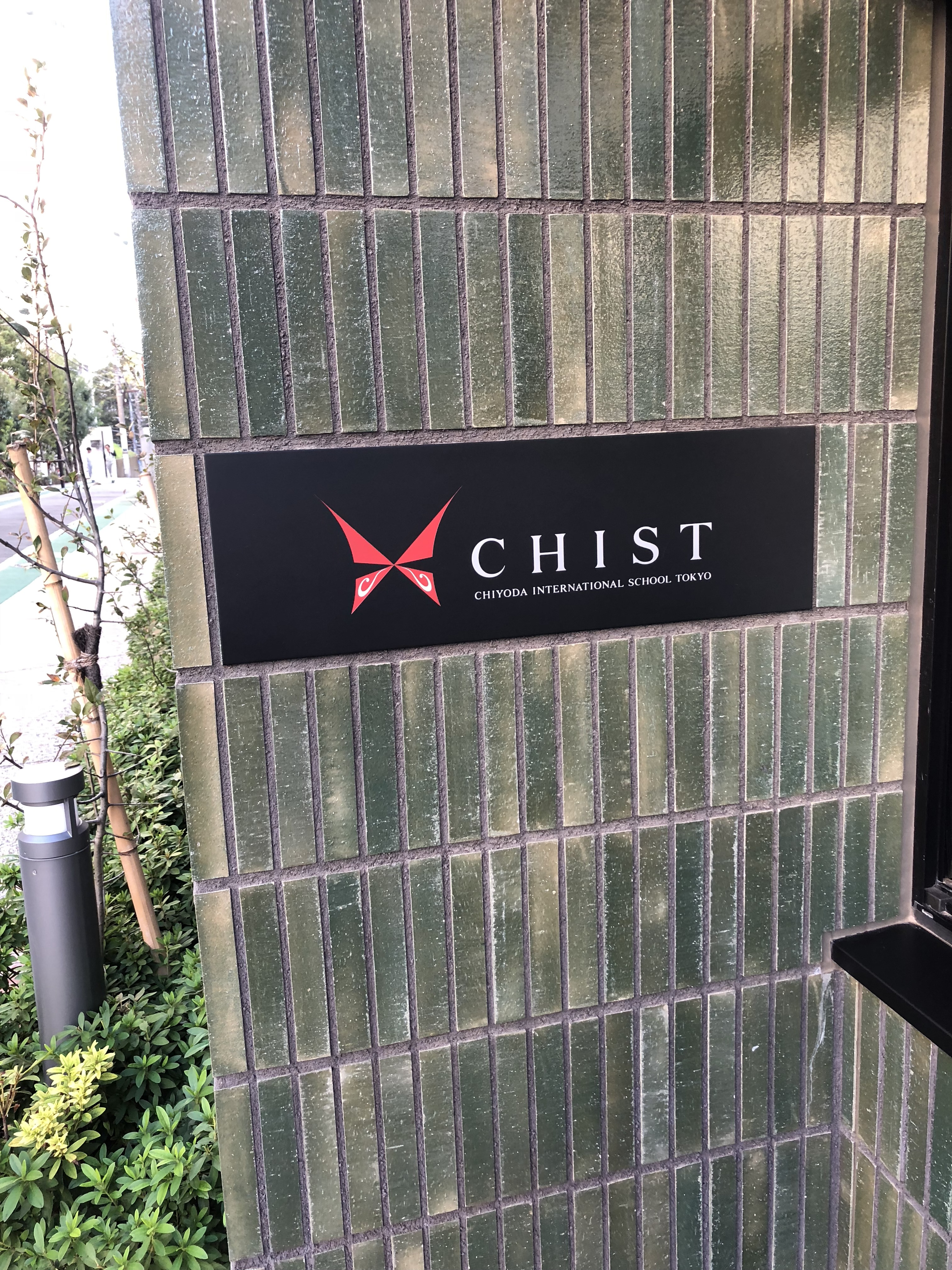

Information
- School type: Private school
- Established: 2018; 7 years ago
- Grades: 1-10
- Gender: Mixed
- Affiliation: Musashino University

Chiyoda International School Tokyo (CHIST) (Japanese: 千代田インターナショナルスクール東京, romanized: Chiyoda intānashonarusukūru Tōkyō) was founded and opened by Musashino University in 2018.

CHIST has grades 1–10. The school is a private coeducational institution. CHIST has the standard array of educational subjects and programs. It is located in the central ward of Chiyoda-ku and is currently in the candidacy phase for the International Baccalaureate (IB) Primary Years, Middle Years, and Diploma Programmes.
