= Fujimi, Chiyoda, Tokyo =

Fujimi 富士見
- District
- Interactive map of Fujimi
- Coordinates: 35°41′57.9″N 139°44′41.61″E
- Country: Japan
- City: Tokyo
- Ward: Chiyoda
- Area: Kōjimachi Area

Population (June 1, 2020)
  - Total: 4,444
- Time zone: UTC+9 (JST)
- Postal code: 102-0071
- Area code: 03

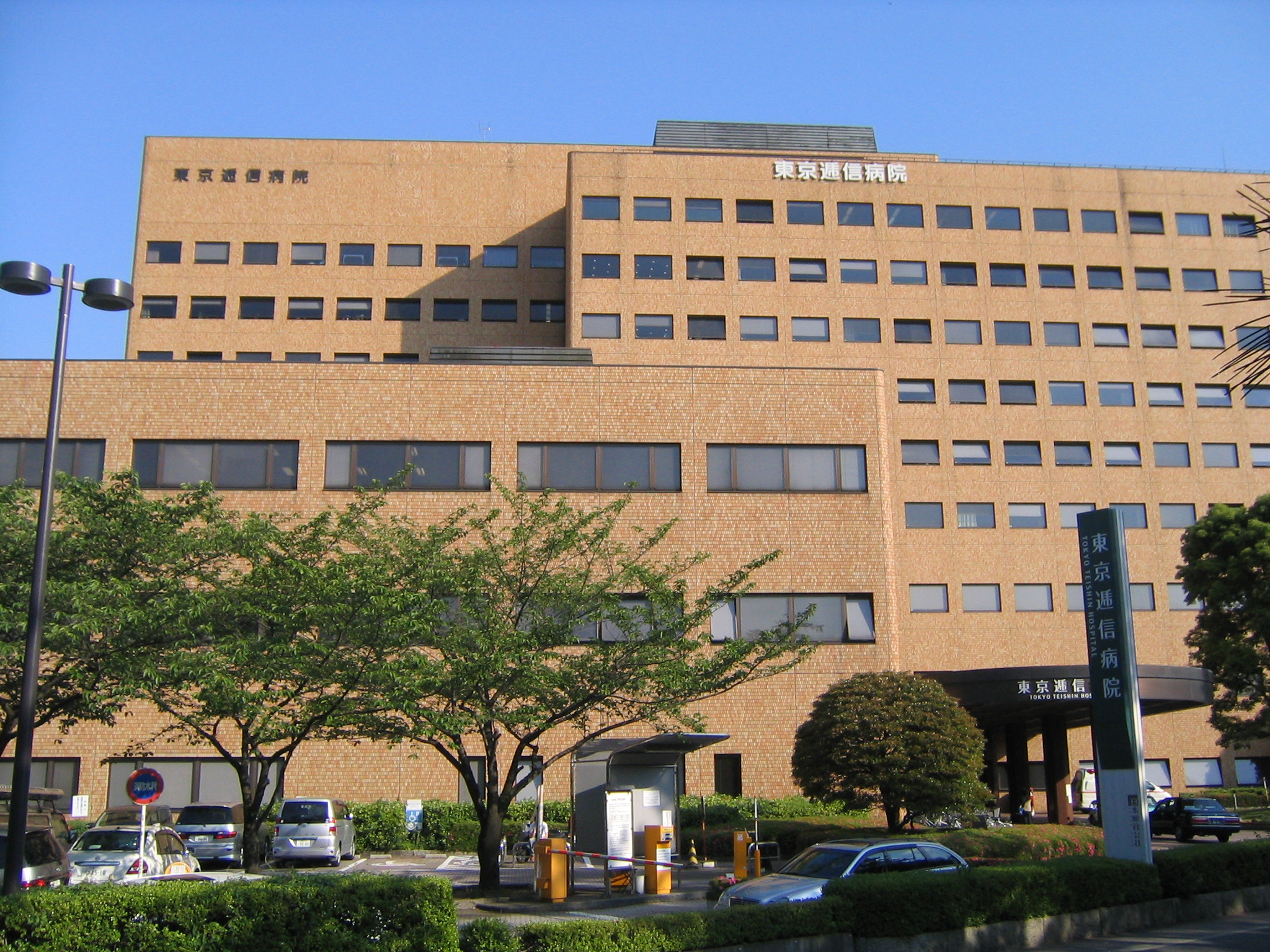
Tokyo Teishin Hospital

Fujimi (富士見, Fujimi) is a district of Chiyoda, Tokyo, Japan.

Formerly part of the Banchō area, it is an upper scale mostly residential area. It houses several educational facilities, notably Hosei University, as well as the Kudan, the residence of the Philippine ambassador to Japan, the Embassy of East Timor, and the de facto Embassy of DPRK.

== Education ==
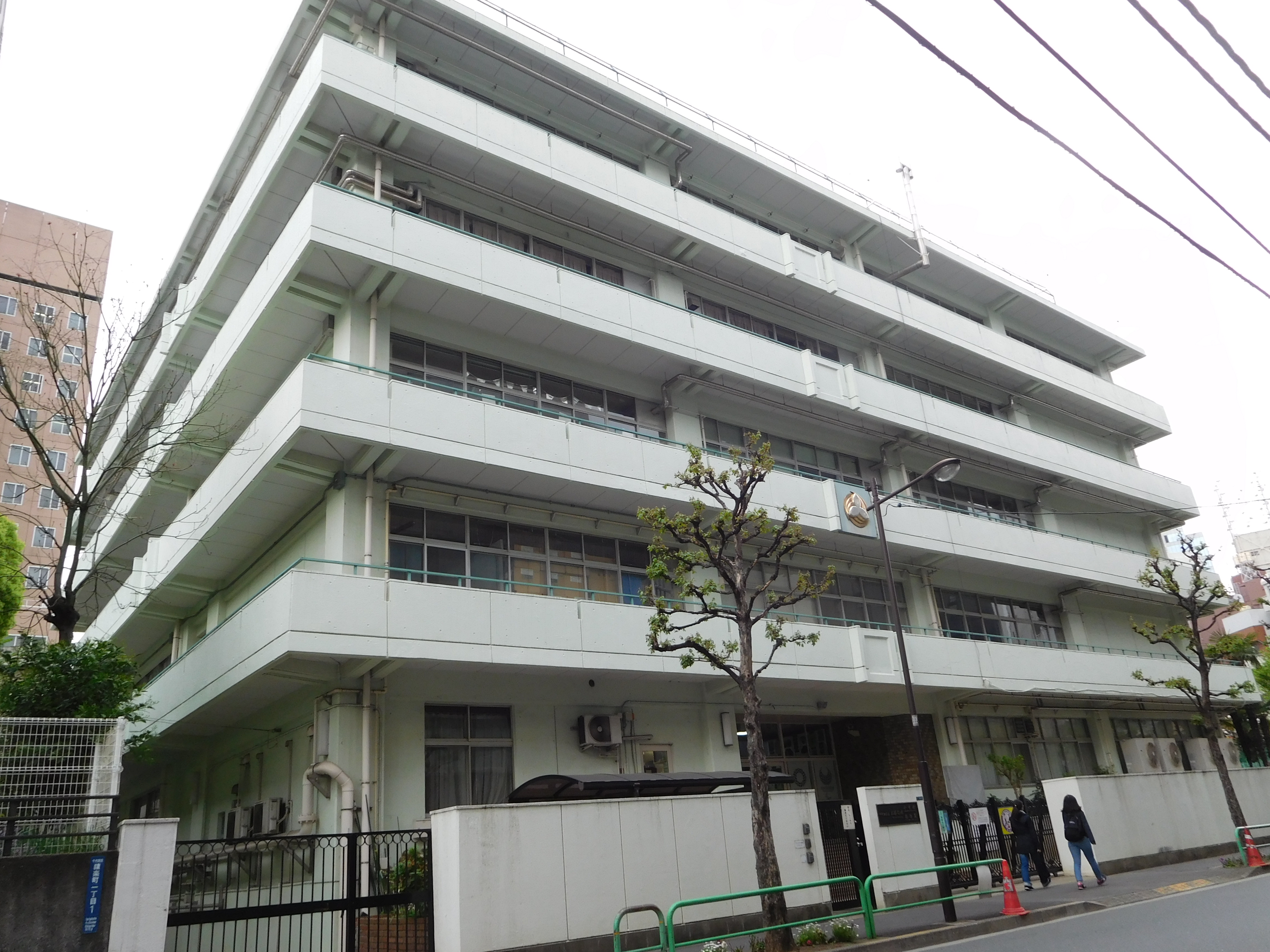
Chiyoda Ochanomizu Elementary School (千代田区立お茶の水小学校) is not the zoned elementary school of Fujimi, but is located in Fujimi

Chiyoda Board of Education operates public elementary and junior high schools. Fujimi Elementary School (富士見小学校) is the zoned elementary of Fujimi 1-2 chōme. There is a freedom of choice system for junior high schools in Chiyoda Ward, and so there are no specific junior high school zones.

Ochanomizu Elementary School (お茶の水小学校), while not the zoned elementary school of Fujimi, is in Fujimi. It was created in 1993 as the merger of Kinka Elementary School (錦華小学校), Nishikanda Elementary School (西神田小学), and Ogawa Elementary School (小川小学校). The Kinka building became the Ochanomizu Elementary building.

A private school, Gyosei Junior and Senior High School, is in Fujimi.

At one time Lycée Français International de Tokyo, then the Lycée Franco-Japonais de Tokyo, was in Fujimi.
