= Rokubanchō, Chiyoda, Tokyo =

Rokubanchō 六番町
- District
- Interactive map of Rokubanchō
- Coordinates: 35°41′11.5″N 139°43′57.35″E
- Country: Japan
- City: Tokyo
- Ward: Chiyoda
- Area: Kōjimachi Area

Population (June 1, 2020)
  - Total: 1,732
- Time zone: UTC+9 (JST)
- Postal code: 102-0081
- Area code: 03

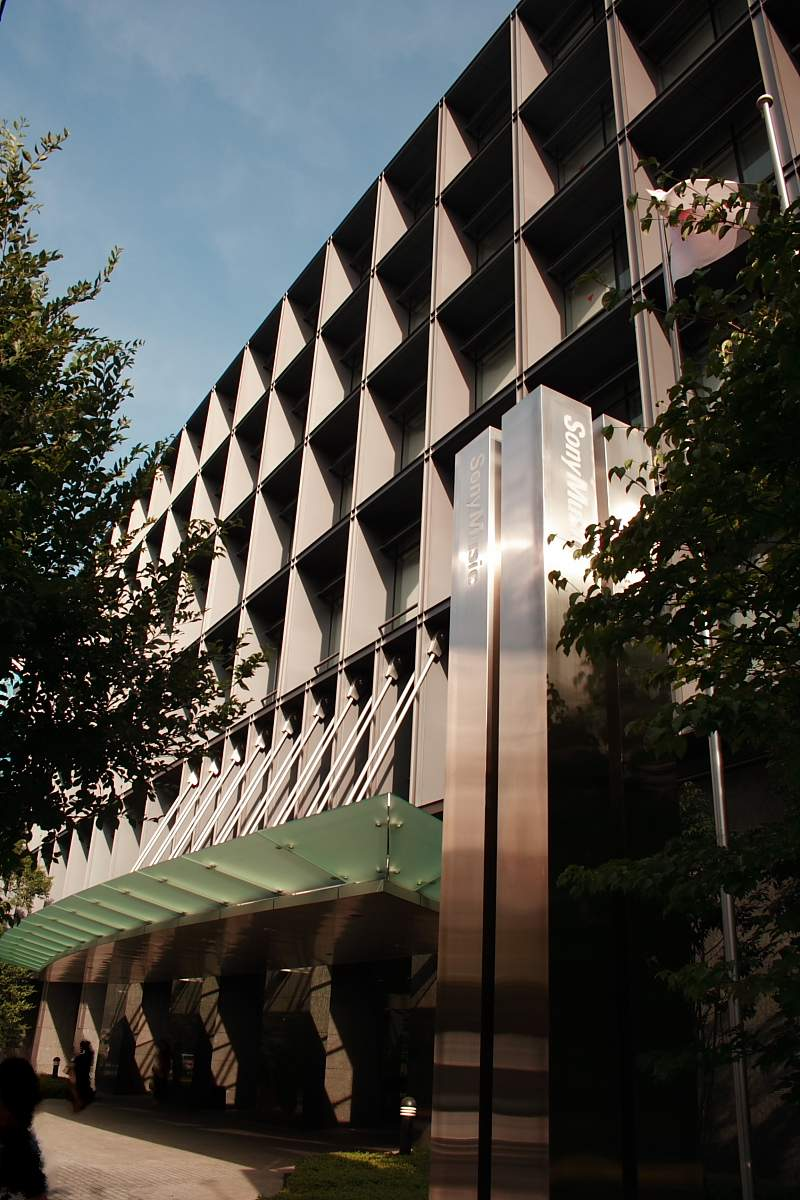
SME-Honsya-Syaoku

Part of the Banchō area, Rokubanchō (六番町) is a mostly residential district of Chiyoda, Tokyo, Japan. The area has been known for being the most expensive residential area in the country. As of June 2020, the population of this district is 1,732 in 719 households.

== Education ==
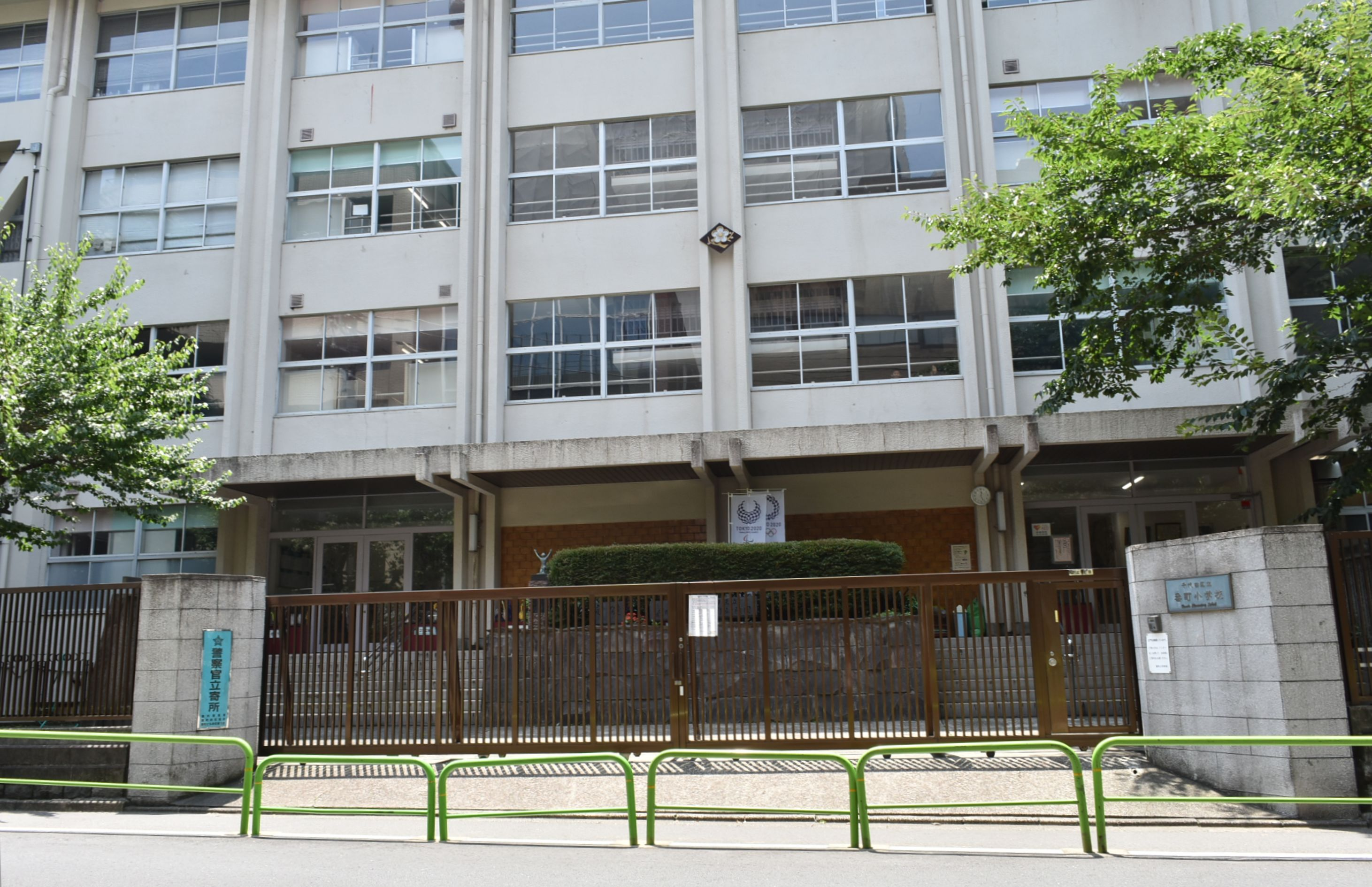
Banchō Elementary School (番町小学校)

Chiyoda Board of Education operates public elementary and junior high schools. Banchō Elementary School (番町小学校) is the zoned elementary school for Rokubanchō. There is a freedom of choice system for junior high schools in Chiyoda Ward, and so there are no specific junior high school zones.
