= Kotaka Otsuma =

Kotaka Otsuma (大妻 コタカ, Ōtsuma Kotaka, June 21, 1884 – January 3, 1970) was born on June 21, 1884, in Kawashiri, Kōzan Town, Sera County, Hiroshima Prefecture, the third daughter of Shōjūrō Kumada (熊田 小十郎). After studying at Kawashiri Elementary School, Hongo Middle School, and the Kozan Needlecraft School, she found employment at a local elementary school.

In 1901 she moved to Tokyo and enrolled in Wayo Women's University, subsequently taking a teaching position in Kanagawa Prefecture.

In 1907 she married Ryōma Ōtsuma (大妻 良馬), an employee of the Imperial Household Ministry. With his help and support, she founded a needlecraft school in Chiyoda, Tokyo, a stone's throw from the Imperial Palace (Kokyo). This school later developed into the Otsuma Girls' Middle and High Schools and Otsuma Women's University and Junior College.

In 1952 she founded the Kozan Art and Craft High School and remained its head until her death.

Otsuma died on January 3, 1970.

Otsuma is widely regarded as one of the pioneers of women's education in Japan, even though the curricula of her schools emphasized home economics and traditional social values. Her connections to the Imperial Palace and her active support of the militaristic government led to her being investigated after the Pacific War, but no action was taken. Conversely, her contributions to Japanese education were recognized by the following Imperial Awards:

- 1954 Medal with Blue Ribbon (藍綬褒章, ranjuhōshō)
- 1964 Order of the Precious Crown, Butterfly (宝冠白蝶章, hōkanshirochōshō)
- 1970 Order of the Sacred Treasure, Gold and Silver Star (瑞宝重光章, zuihōjūkōshō)

In 2002 she was posthumously made an Honorary Citizen of Kozan Town.
