= Nishogakusha University =

Private University in Chiyoda, Tokyo, Japan

Coordinates: 35.6922°N 139.7458°E

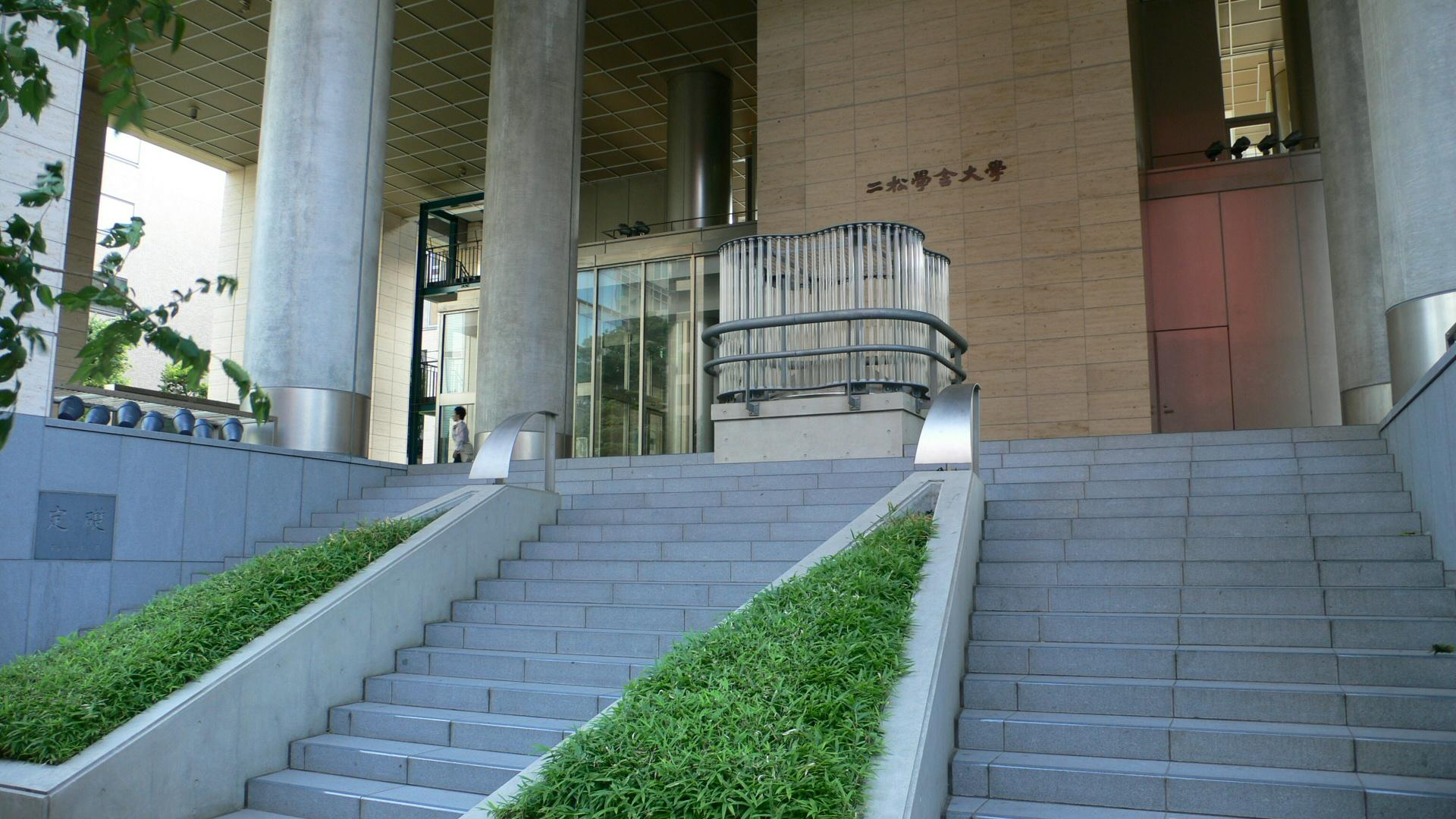
Kudan Campus

Nishogakusha University (二松學舍大学, Nishōgakusha daigaku) is a private university in Chiyoda, Tokyo, Japan. The predecessor of the school was founded in 1877, and it was chartered as a university in 1949.
