= Otsuma Women's University =

Coordinates: 35°41′28.4″N 139°44′34.8″E

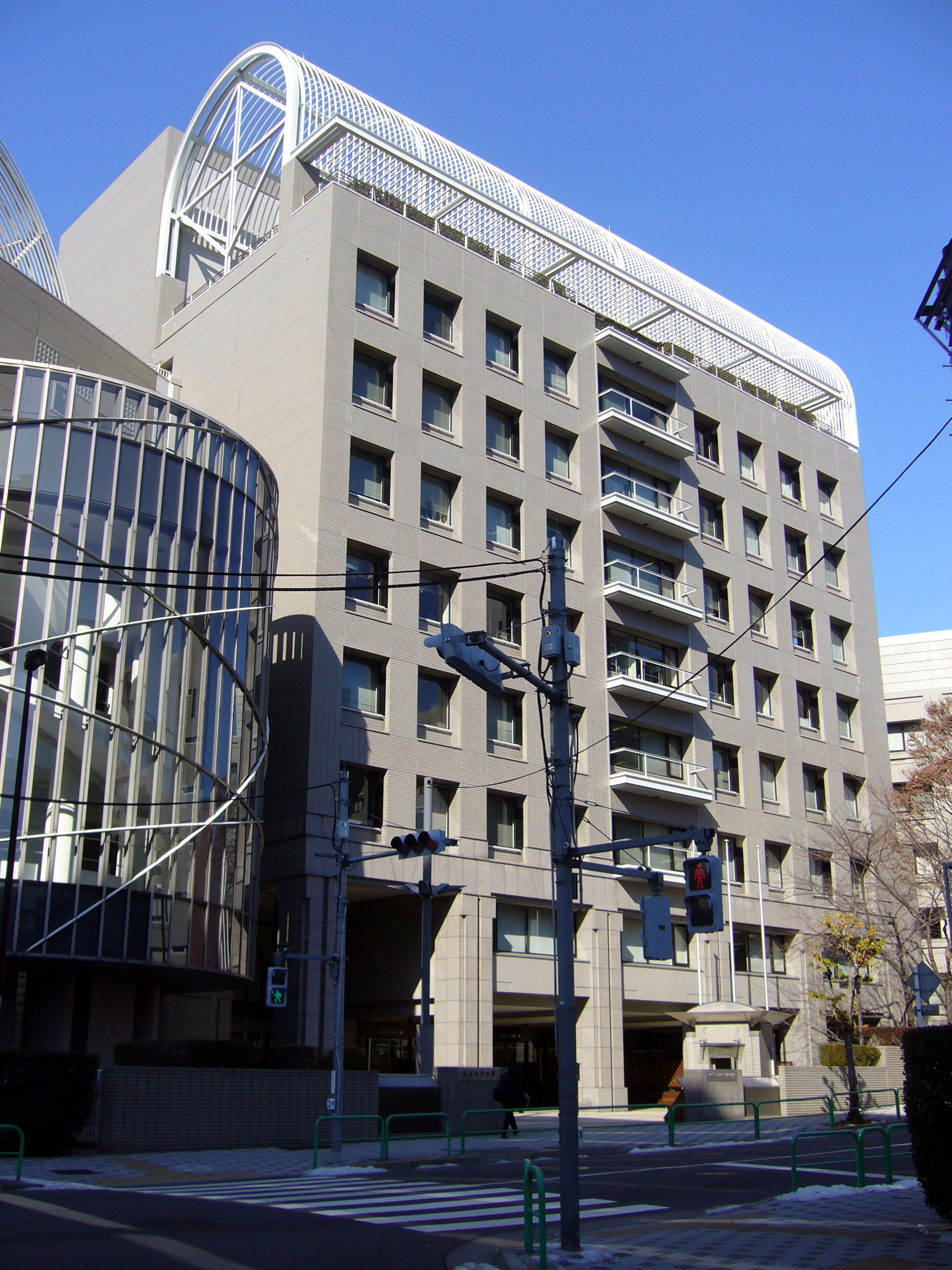

Otsuma Women's University (大妻女子大学, Ōtsuma-joshi-daigaku) is a private university in Chiyoda, Tokyo, Japan.

Founded in 1949, it is located in Sanbanchō, near the Imperial Palace in the Chiyoda City. It began as a sewing school opened by Otsuma Kotaka (1884–1970) in 1908. From this grew the Otsuma Girls' High School (1935) and the Otsuma Women's Vocational School (1942).

Otsuma Kotaka (大妻コタカ) was a pioneer of traditional women's education, emphasizing scientific training in homemaking skills. For almost twenty years the university specialized in home economics and became synonymous with the education of 'good wives and wise mothers' (良妻賢母, ryōsai-kenbo). An adjacent two-year junior college was established in 1950.

In 1967 the university expanded with establishment of a Faculty of Language and Literature and construction of a second campus in Sayamadai, Saitama. Two hitherto independent girls' middle and high schools (Otsuma Nakano and Otsuma Ranzan) were also affiliated. In 1990 a third campus and a fourth affiliated high school were opened in Tama, Tokyo.

Like many other women's universities in Japan, Otsuma has faced the challenge of a rapidly changing job market for women. In the 70s and 80s the demand was for junior college graduates and for most of this period the Otsuma Junior College English Department was at the top of the national rankings.

The subsequent shift to a demand for four-year graduates has resulted in the retrenchment of the junior college and the creation of several new faculties, including Social Information Studies and Comparative Cultures. On December 26, 1975, Popular girl group, The Candies performed their concert at that location.
