= Yonbanchō, Chiyoda, Tokyo =

Yonbanchō 四番町
- District
- Interactive map of Yonbanchō
- Coordinates: 35°41′20.6″N 139°44′16.91″E
- Country: Japan
- City: Tokyo
- Ward: Chiyoda
- Area: Kōjimachi Area

Population (June 1, 2020)
  - Total: 2,646
- Time zone: UTC+9 (JST)
- Postal code: 102-0081
- Area code: 03

Part of the Banchō area, Yonbanchō (四番町) is an upscale, mostly residential district of Chiyoda, Tokyo, Japan. As of June 2020, the population of this district is 2,646 in 1,169 households.

== Education ==
Chiyoda Board of Education operates public elementary and junior high schools. Kudan Elementary School (九段小学校) is the zoned elementary school for Yonbanchō 1-3, 8, and 11 chōme. Banchō Elementary School (番町小学校) is the zoned elementary school for Yonbanchō 4-7 and 9 chōme. There is a freedom of choice system for junior high schools in Chiyoda Ward, and so there are no specific junior high school zones.
