= Japanese community of Paris =

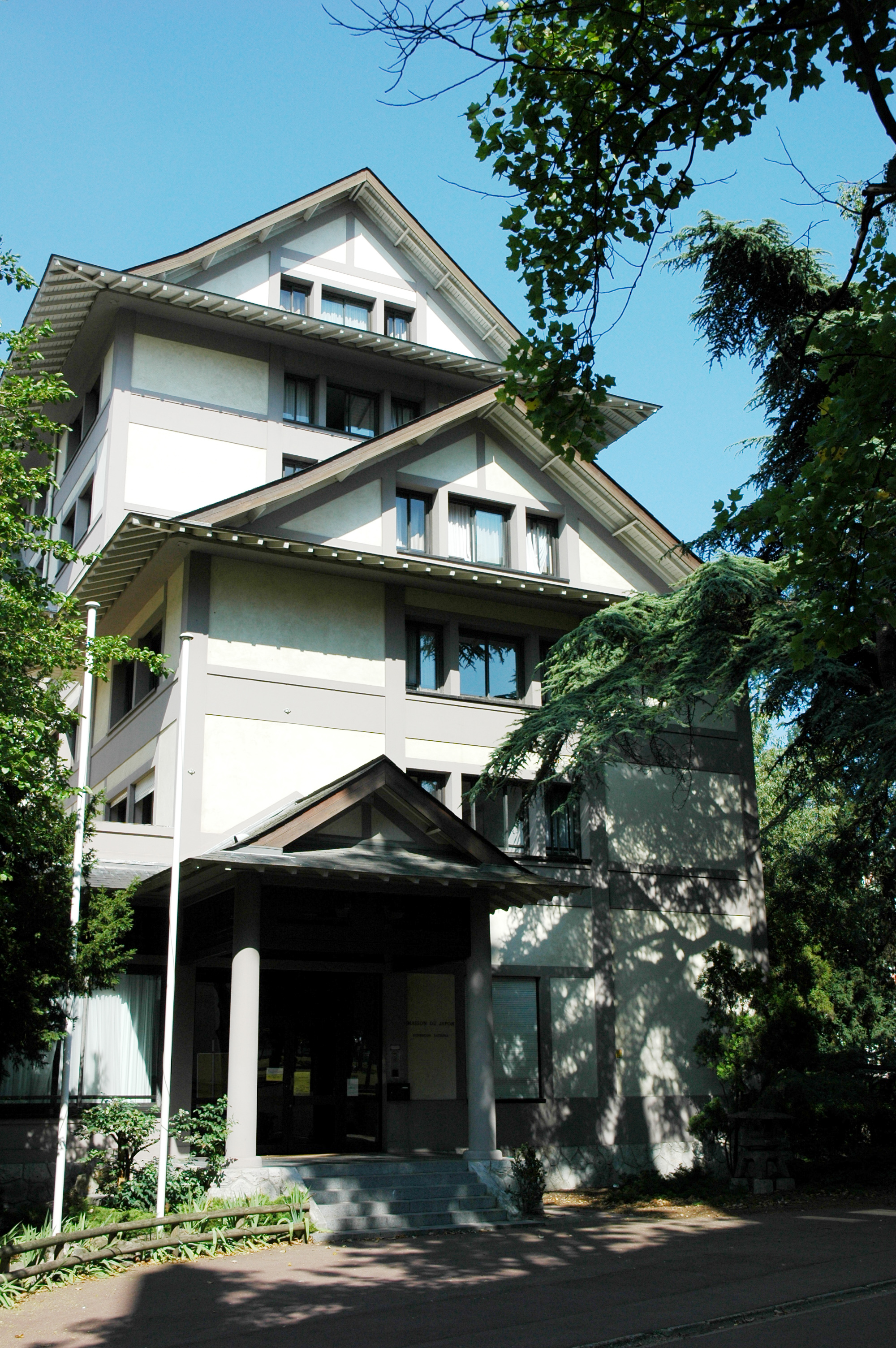
Cité Universitaire, Maison du Japon

The Paris Metropolitan Area includes a Japanese community (French: Communauté japonaise de Paris; Japanese: パリの日本人コミュニティ). In 2023, the official number of Japanese residents in Paris was 10,592, compared to 16,277 a decade prior.

== History ==
In the early 1960s duty-free shops catering to Japanese visitors opened in Paris. Afterwards businesses catering to longer-term residents opened. The director of the publication Ovni, Bernard Bérnaud, stated that "The number of Japanese coming to live in France was very small until 1965 or even into the 70s." In 1991, Jessica Rutman of Look Japan stated that due to the economic status of Japan, the Japanese migrants did not stoke nationalist tensions brought out by immigrants from Africa and China.

== Geographic distribution ==
While other Asian ethnic groups arrived in Paris as poor refugees and established clusters of communities such as the Paris Chinatown, in 1995 the Japanese came mainly on relatively short stays and live close to their workplaces. Tatsuio Arai, the first secretary of the Embassy of Japan, Paris, stated in 1995 that there are few areas in Paris with high concentrations of Japanese residents other than the Maison du Japon, a boarding house for Japanese students. Isabelle Molieux, the manager of a grocery store catering to Japanese expatriates who was quoted in The New York Times, stated in 1995 that she believed the Paris Japanese community is "very individualist" and that they prefer to not publicly assert their Japanese identity but adapt to the culture in Paris, so therefore they are less inclined to live in the same area.

In 2013, Japanese businesspeople tended to settle in rental properties in western Paris and western suburbs of Paris, primarily in the 15th arrondissement and the 16th arrondissement of Paris. In 1991, Japanese tended to live in the 15th and 16th arrondissements and the suburban communities of Boulogne-Billancourt and Neuilly-sur-Seine. Rutman stated that because those areas are expensive, it is an example of Japanese people isolating themselves from the wider community instead of assimilating into French society.

Marie Conte-Holm, author of The Japanese and Europe: Economic and Cultural Encounters, wrote that the bus route to and from the Institut Culturel Franco-Japonais – École Japonaise de Paris "essentially determines" where Japanese families with children settle in Greater Paris. The Japanese settle in different areas according to rank, with shachō business executives clustering around Neuilly-sur-Seine, company directors living in Passy, and Japanese of lower socioeconomic ranks living around the Hotel Nikko and in the Left Bank. An area around Neuilly-sur-Seine has the joke name "President's Street" or "Shachō Dōri" (社長通り).

In 1995 the Opéra area had a large number of Japanese businesses, but few Japanese residents, and Arai stated that this area would not be thought of as being like a Chinatown since there are few Japanese residents.

== Commerce ==
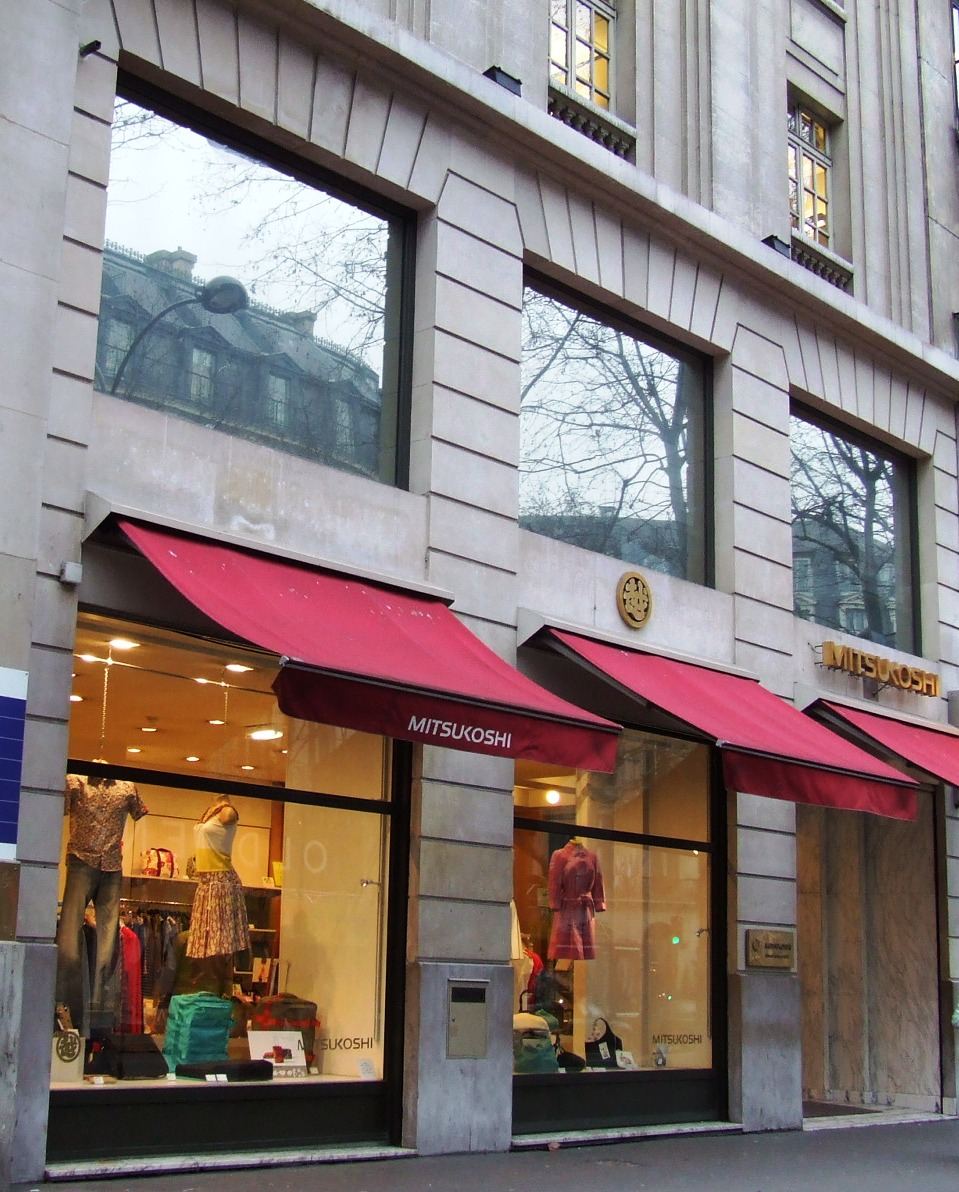
Mitsukoshi Paris, which closed in 2010

Businesspeople and their families tend to purchase Japanese foodstuffs at Daimaru France and the Centre International de Paris at Porte Maillot. Residents on a budget and students tend to go to the Paris Chinatown to purchase Japanese foodstuffs. Daimaru France SA was established in September 1973. Paris includes over 70 Japanese restaurants with different price ranges and clienteles. A group of Japanese karaoke bars, offices, banks, shops, and department stores are located in the Avenue de l'Opera and Rue Sainte-Anne area.

The Japanese bakery and patisserie chains Saint Germain of Tokyu Group, Toraya, and Yamazaki have operations in Paris. The Paris Saint Germain outlet opened in 1979.

Japanese-operated businesses in Paris include architects, lawyer firms, hotels, golf clubs, travel agencies, real estate agencies, public relations firms, and newspaper offices. Businesses in Paris catering to Japanese residents include dress shops, bookshops, hairdressers, opticians, and department stores.

In 1995 the Opéra area had over 20 duty-free shops catering to Japanese. In 1995 there were multiple Japanese restaurants on Rue Sainte Anne, some catering to French, and some catering to Japanese. Those that catered to French were mainly operated by non-Japanese such as Cambodians, Thais, and Vietnamese.

The Paris Mitsukoshi opened in 1971. In 1996 it made ¥5.7 billion in sales. After the September 11 attacks business declined as consumers avoiding traveling by air. By 2010 business among Japanese visitors declined as many visited local shops instead of the Mitsukoshi. In 2009 the store made ¥1.7 billion in sales. It closed in 2010 due to a lack of Japanese visitors.

== Education ==
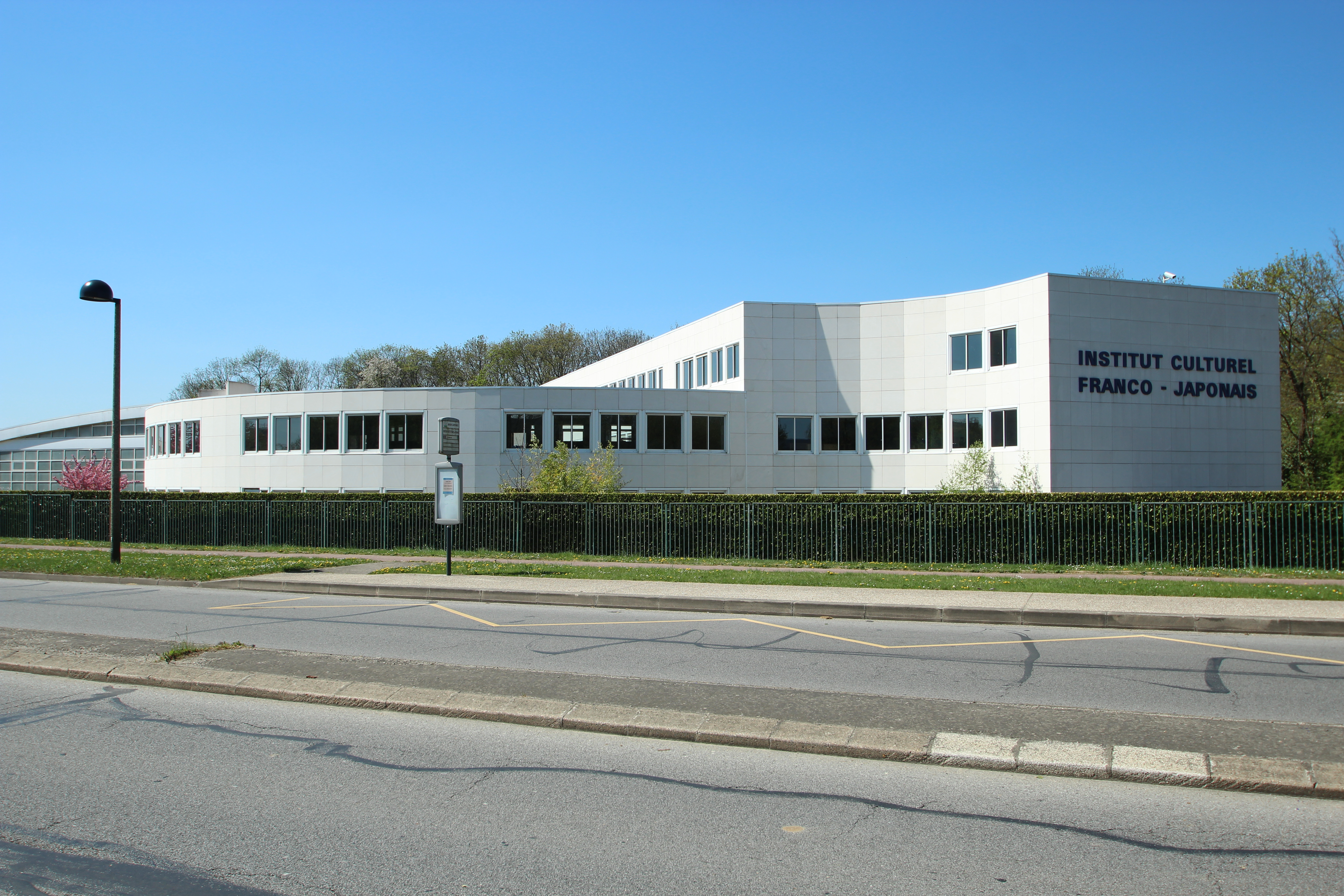
Institut Culturel Franco-Japonais – École Japonaise de Paris

The Institut Culturel Franco-Japonais – École Japonaise de Paris, a Japanese international school is located in the suburb of Montigny-le-Bretonneux. It opened in Trocadéro, Paris in 1973 and moved to its current location in 1990. Japanese is the primary language of instruction of the school, serving elementary and junior high levels, while students also take French classes. Due to the long distance to the school from some points in the Paris area, some families opt to send their children to French schools and have their children attend Saturday Japanese schools such as the Takehara School, a privately operated school in Paris.

For high school some students attend the International School of Paris (ISP). In 1992 the Japanese became the largest group at ISP, making up 19% of the students that year. Historically other students had attended now-defunct Japanese boarding high schools in France, including the Lycée Seijo in Alsace, before its 2005 closure, and the Lycée Konan near Tours, before its 2013 closure. Lycée Seijo was a branch of Seijo Gakuen and Lycée Konan was a branch of Konan Gakuen.

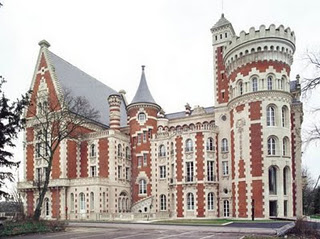
The Lycée International de Saint Germain-en-Laye in Saint Germain-en-Laye includes a section for Japanese students

The École de langue japonaise de Paris (パリ日本語補習校 Pari Nihongo Hoshūkō), a supplementary Japanese education program, has its classes held at the École Maternelle et Primaire Saint Francois d'Eylau in the 16th arrondissement of Paris, and its offices are located at the Association Amicale des Ressortissants Japonais en France (AARJF). In addition, the Association Eveil Japon (エベイユ学園 Ebeiyu Gakuen) is located in Boulogne-Billancourt. Also the Japanese Ministry of Education, Culture, Sports, Science and Technology (MEXT) lists the Japanese section of the Lycée international de Saint-Germain-en-Laye in Saint-Germain-en-Laye with its list of part-time programs.

Conte-Helm wrote that "While some Japanese children attend local schools for a proportion of their time in France, even the more internationally minded Japanese parents will transfer their offspring to the Japanese School for reorientation during the latter part of their stay."

In 1991 Jessica Rutman wrote that the choice of Japanese international schools is an example of Japanese people isolating themselves from the wider community instead of assimilating into it.

== Institutions ==
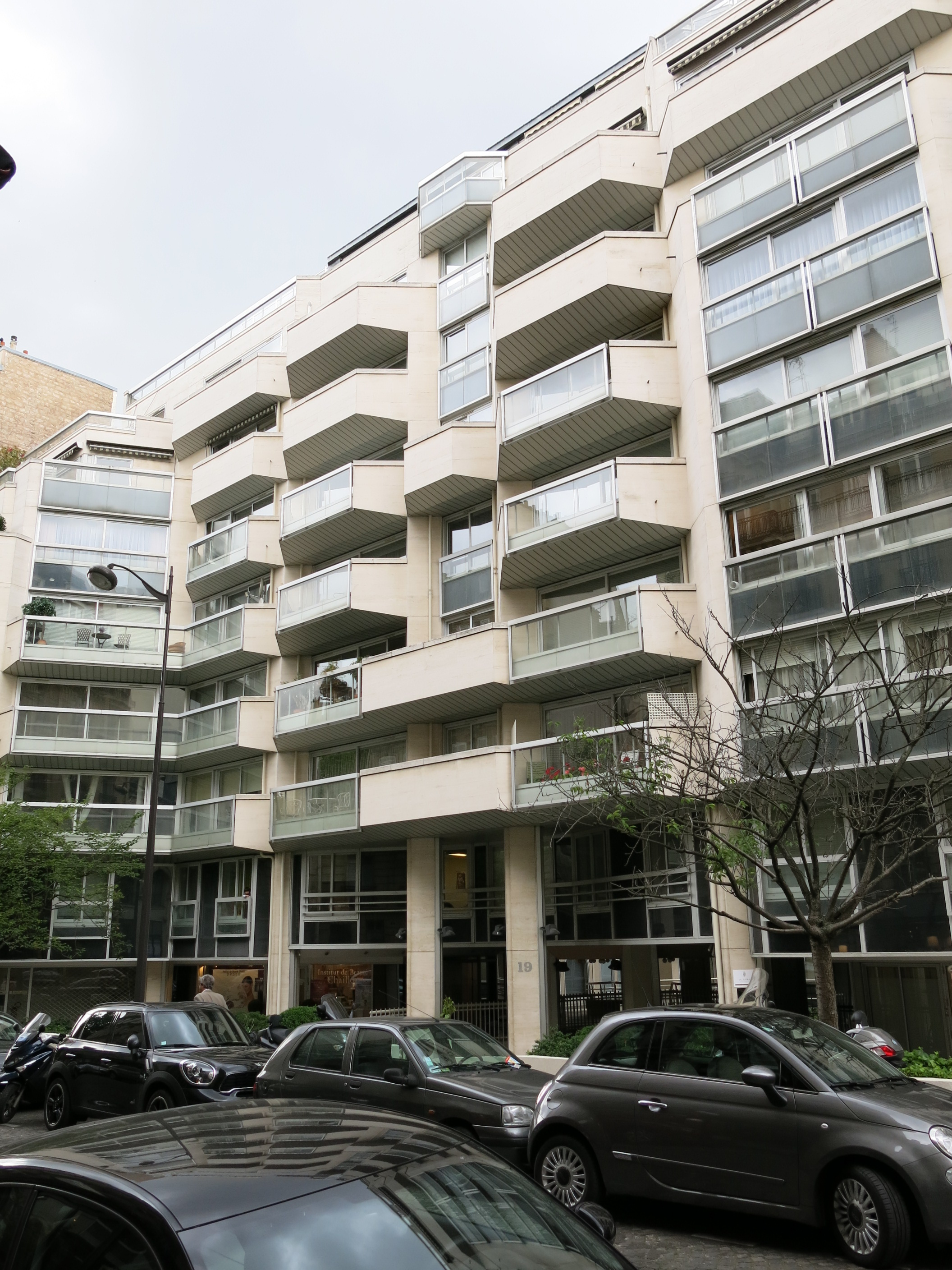
The building housing the AARJF headquarters

The Association Amicale des Ressortissants Japonais en France (AARJF) or the Nihonjinkai (在仏日本人会 Zai Futsu Nihonjinkai) has 10,000 individual Japanese and French members and 3,700 family members. Its headquarters are on the Champs-Elysées, in the 16th arrondissement of Paris.

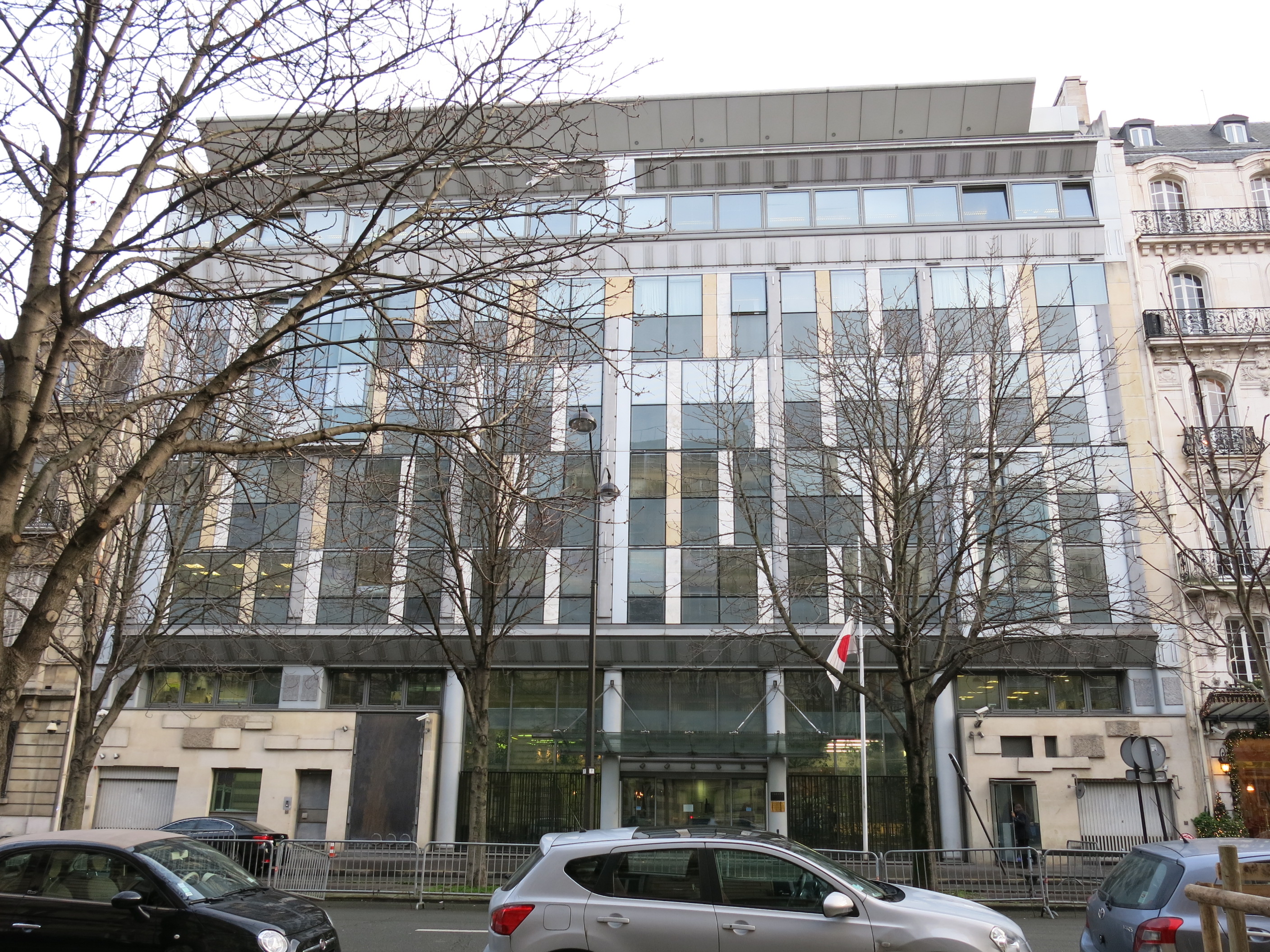
The Embassy of Japan in Paris

The AARJF is one of the largest Japanese associations in Paris. The association helps Japanese who have newly arrived to France adapt to their new home. The association has a lending library on its premises. Conte-Helm wrote that unlike in "more exclusively centred Japanese communities of Europe" the Japanese association has a "broader atmosphere". Japanese of different groups, including business families, tourists, and students, mix together on the property of the association.

The Japanese government operates the Embassy of Japan in Paris.

== Media ==
In 2013 there were seven Japanese-language digests in Paris. One, Journal Japon, includes information on Japanese cultural pastimes, Japanese news, and Japanese services. The Association Amicale des Ressortissants Japonais en France publishes the Journal Japon. The association also publishes the Japanese Guide to Living to Paris which lists cultural activities.

== Lifestyle and recreation ==
Japanese cultural House in Paris (French: Maison de la culture du Japon à Paris)

A typical Japanese employee living in France spends about three to five years there. In 1991 Japanese companies typically provided housing and automobiles as part of employment packages. Due to the short lengths of their stays, their places of employment become their social centers, and in 1995 Arai stated that there is therefore "little opportunity for a sense of community to develop". Isabelle Molieux stated that "In Paris the Japanese culture stays in the house."

Jessica Rutman of Look Japan stated in 1991 that Japanese workers usually converse with French citizens at work but that many Japanese children in Paris, especially those that attend the Japanese school, "may never make friends with French peers." Rutman added that because many businesses such as the area Mitsukoshi, area Japanese restaurants, and four nail salons with services for Japanese all provide business in the Japanese language, the housewives "are perhaps the most likely to mold their lives around the Japanese community, never progressing beyond elementary French." Rutman stated that Japanese who come to France to learn the language are more likely to have contact with French people than Japanese sent by companies.

The Alliance Française offers French classes tailored to Japanese speakers. Recreational activities for the Japanese community include the annual Art Club Exhibition, the annual bazaar, sporting competitions, competitions in calligraphy, go, and haiku, Japanese classes, and French classes.

== Notable residents ==
- Kenzō Takada

== See also ==
- Japanese people in France
- Paris syndrome – Form of tourist disillusionment
