= French-Japanese =

French(-)Japanese or Japanese(-)French may refer to:

- France-Japan relations (cf. "a French-Japanese treaty")
- French language education in Japan (cf. "a French Japanese class")
- Japanese language education in France
- People with multiple citizenship of France and Japan

== See also ==
- French people in Japan
- Japanese people in France
