= List of number-one hits of 1966 (Peru) =

Billboard top one songs in Peru

This is a list of the songs that reached number one in Peru in 1966, according to Billboard magazine with data provided by the Peruvian newspaper, La Prensa.

Issue date	Song	Artist(s)	Ref
January 29	"Chao-Chao"	Pepe Miranda/Hermanas Benítez/Carmita Jiménez/Peter Delis/The New Christy Minstrels	
March 19	"Cuanto más lejos estoy"	Dúo Dinámico	
April 9	"El pompo"	Los Teen Agers/La Sonora Sensación	
April 16	"El pompo"	Los Teen Agers/La Sonora Sensación	
May 21	"El conductor"	José Bedoya/Enrique Lynch/Eulogio Molina/Los Morunos/Alfredo Barrantes/Carlos Muñoz	
June 11	"La chichera"	Los Demonios del Mantaro/Los Demonios del Corocochay/Niko Estrada	
June 25	"La chichera"	Los Demonios del Mantaro/Los Demonios del Corocochay/Niko Estrada	
July 2	"La chichera"	Los Demonios del Mantaro/Los Demonios del Corocochay/Niko Estrada	
July 16	"Yolanda"	Tulio Enrique León/Carlos Pickling/Los Diplomaticos/Los Teen Agers	
July 23	"Dios cómo te amo (Dio come ti amo)”	Gigliola Cinquetti/Violeta Rivas	
July 30	"Juanita Banana”	The Peels/Juan Montega/Mr. Trombone/Los Hills/J. R. Covington/Terry Scott	
November 26	"Strangers in the Night”	Frank Sinatra	

== See also ==
- 1966 in music
