= List of number-one hits of 1965 (Peru) =

This is a list of the songs that reached number one in Peru in 1965, according to Billboard magazine with data provided by the Peruvian newspaper, La Prensa.

| Issue date | Song | Artist(s) | Ref |
|---|---|---|---|
| January 9 | "Ciudad solitaria (Città vuota)" | Luis Aguilé/Mina/Tony Laredo | |
| January 16 | "Ciudad solitaria (Città vuota)" | Luis Aguilé/Mina/Tony Laredo | |
| January 23 | "Ciudad solitaria (Città vuota)" | Luis Aguilé/Mina/Tony Laredo | |
| January 30 | "Ciudad solitaria (Città vuota)" | Luis Aguilé/Mina/Tony Laredo | |
| February 6 | "Ciudad solitaria (Città vuota)" | Luis Aguilé/Mina/Tony Laredo | |
| February 13 | "Ciudad solitaria (Città vuota)" | Luis Aguilé/Mina/Tony Laredo | |
| February 20 | "La pollera amarilla" | Tulio Enrique León/Los Corraleros Del Sinú/Lucho Nelson | |
| February 27 | "La pollera amarilla" | Tulio Enrique León/Los Corraleros Del Sinú/Lucho Nelson | |
| April 3 | "La pollera amarilla" | Tulio Enrique León/Los Corraleros Del Sinú/Lucho Nelson | |
| April 17 | "La pollera amarilla" | Tulio Enrique León/Los Corraleros Del Sinú/Lucho Nelson | |
| May 1 | "La pollera amarilla" | Tulio Enrique León/Los Corraleros Del Sinú/Lucho Nelson | |
| July 3 | "Poema" | Hermanos Arriagada/Trío las Sombras/Anamelba | |
| July 10 | "Poema" | Hermanos Arriagada/Trío las Sombras/Anamelba | |
| July 17 | "Torero" | Hermanos Arriagada | |
| August 7 | "Ron y Tabaco" | Tulio Enrique León/Lucho Macedo | |
| August 28 | "Chévere que Chévere" | Los Teen Agers/Orlando y su Combo | |
| September 11 | "Esos ojitos negros" | Dúo Dinámico | |
| September 25 | "Rondando Tu Esquina" | Lucho Barrios/Julio Jaramillo/Johnny Farfán | |
| October 9 | "Rondando Tu Esquina" | Lucho Barrios/Julio Jaramillo/Johnny Farfán | |
| October 23 | "Sombras" | Javier Solís | |
| November 27 | "Sombras" | Javier Solís | |
| December 25 | "Sombras" | Javier Solís | |

== See also ==
- 1965 in music
