= Institut Culturel Franco-Japonais – École Japonaise de Paris =

- パリ日本人学校

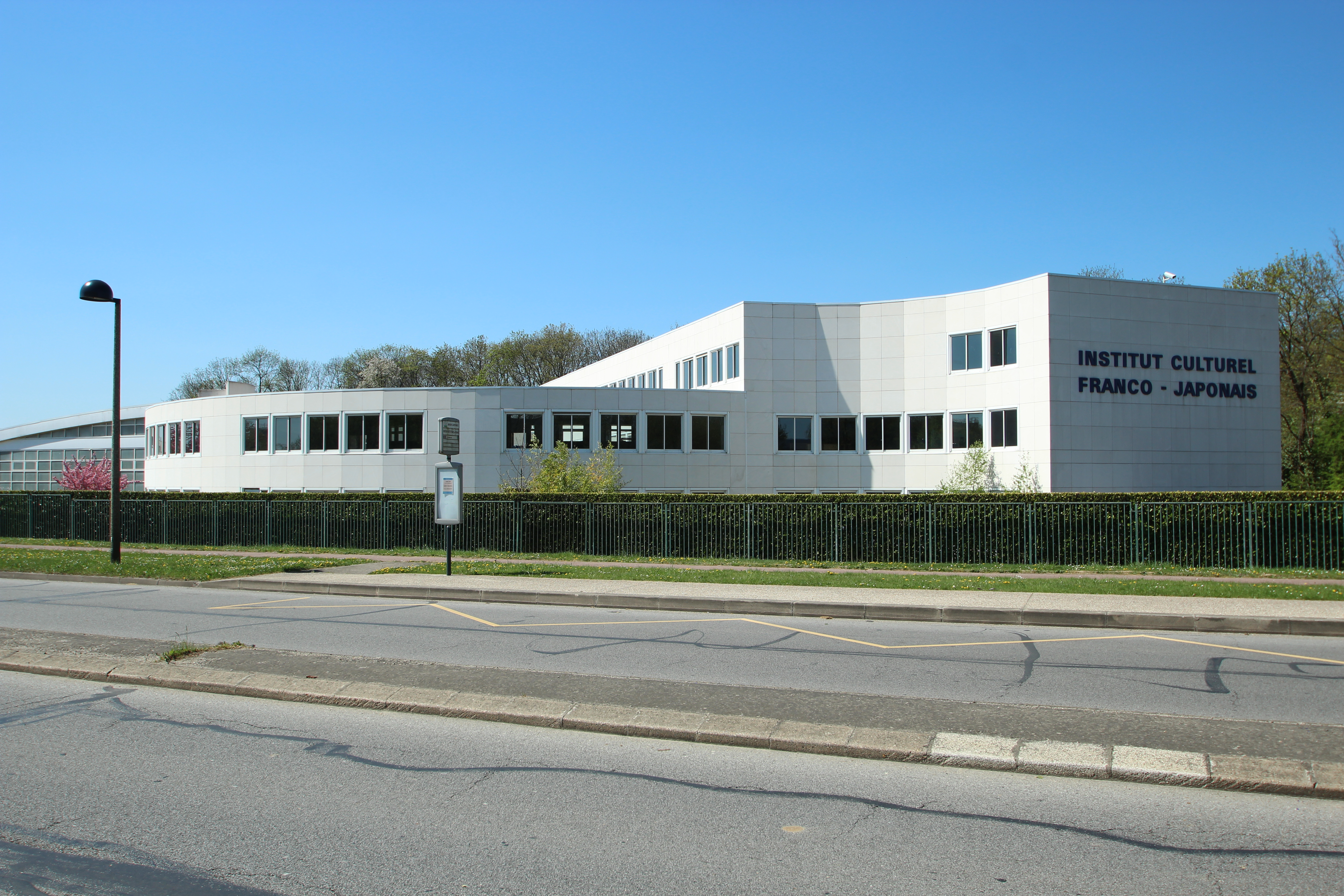

Location
- 7 rue Jean-Pierre Timbaud 78180 Montigny-le-Bretonneux FRANCE; Montigny-le-Bretonneux; France; 48.7913°N 2.0346°E

Information
- Type: Primary & middle school
- Established: 1973; 53 years ago
- Grades: 1-9
- Website: www.parinichi.com

The Institut Culturel Franco-Japonais – École Japonaise de Paris ("French-Japanese Cultural Institute - Japanese School of Paris" - Japanese: 日仏文化学院パリ日本人学校 Nichifutsu Bunka Gakuin Pari Nihonjin Gakkō) is a Japanese international school located in Montigny-le-Bretonneux, Île-de-France, France, in the Paris metropolitan Area. The school is located in proximity to Versailles. Japanese is the primary language of instruction while students also take French classes.

The school serves ages 6 through 15. Marie Conte-Holm, author of The Japanese and Europe, wrote that the bus route to and from the school "essentially determines" where Japanese families with children settle in Greater Paris. She also wrote that "While some Japanese children attend local schools for a proportion of their time in France, even the more internationally minded Japanese parents will transfer their offspring to the Japanese School for reorientation during the latter part of their stay."

As of 2020 the school is led by Principal Onoe (小野江 校長).

== History ==
The Japanese Chamber of Commerce and Industry established the Japanese School in 1973. It was located in Trocadéro in the 16th arrondissement of Paris and it had opened with 100 students. In the 1980s the school expanded rapidly. In 1990 it moved to a building that had been erected to serve as the Japanese school. Japanese companies had funded the new school building. That year, the school had 563 students in elementary school and junior high school. In 1991 it had 500 students, around the time of its peak enrollment and the time of peak investment from Japanese companies. Since then a Japanese recession occurred. In 2013 the school had 380 students.

== Operations and curriculum ==
The school committee overseeing the school includes representatives of Japanese companies with offices in the Paris area. The tuition paid by parents is comparable to tuition at Japanese private schools.

The school emphasizes the maintenance and cultivation of Japaneseness in its students while also promoting international understanding. As part of the latter, the school has its ninth grade students participate in class exchange visits with area French schools, and the Japanese school and the French schools partake in events in the School Festival compete in the Annual Sports Day. In addition, the Japanese school offers Saturday morning Japanese classes to the local community.

=== Curriculum ===
The Japanese Ministry of Education sets the curriculum, which is intended to provide a Japanese-style education and allow students to re-enter Japanese schools. The ministry also sends teachers to teach at the Japanese school. The school has no Saturday morning programme so seven classes per day are offered instead of six. The local authority requires the school to offer French classes for two to three hours per week, so the school uses French and Japanese French-language teachers.

== Transport ==
The school runs eight daily buses throughout the Paris area to pick up and drop off students.

== See also ==
- Japanese community of Paris
- Japanese people in France
- Lycée Konan - Defunct Japanese boarding school near Tours
- Lycée Seijo - Defunct Japanese boarding school in Alsace
