= EFK =

EFK may refer to:

- École Française du Kansai, now the Lycée français international de Kyoto, a French international school in Japan
- Evangelical Free Church in Sweden
- Northeast Kingdom International Airport, in Vermont, United States
