= LFK =

LFK may refer to:

- Lycée Français de Kyoto
- LFK NG, a guided missile
- IATA code LFK, which is assigned to Angelina County Airport
