= Lycée Français International de Tokyo =

Lycée français international de Tokyo
- 東京国際フランス学園

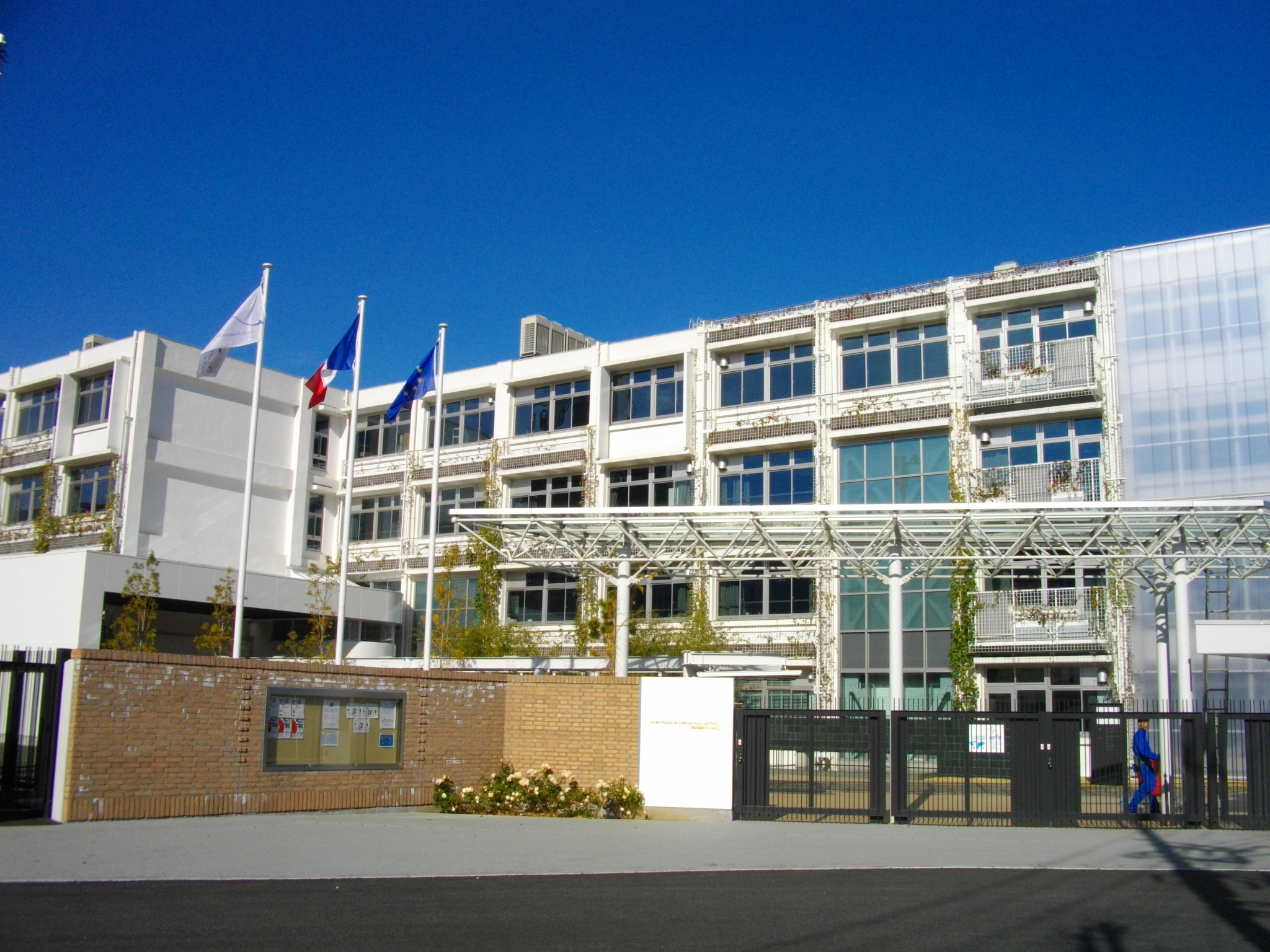

Location
- 5-57-37 Takinogawa Kita-ku, 114-0023 Tokyo 〒114-0023 東京都北区滝野川5-57-37; 35.7503°N 139.7236°E

Information
- Website: lfitokyo.org

The Lycée français international de Tokyo (LFI Tokyo, Japanese: 東京国際フランス学園 Tōkyō Kokusai Furansu Gakuen) is a French international school in Tokyo with over 1575 students representing more than 65 nationalities. The school consists of a kindergarten, an elementary school, a middle school and a high school.

The LFI Tokyo is one of two French schools in Japan recognized by the French Ministry of National Education, alongside the Lycée Français de Kyoto. The school is based on two campuses spanning over 2 hectares with a swimming pool, a soccer field, a gymnasium, a dojo, a tennis court, a running track and an auditorium. The school also has two libraries, two cafeterias and a dedicated music room and science room.

The school has been part of the network of establishments of the Agency for French Education Abroad (AEFE, according to its French name) since its creation in 1990.

== History ==
In May 1967, a grant from the French government lead to the creation of a new building in the Gyosei School in order to teach French. In 1973, the building was bought by France, and in January 1975 became the Lycée franco-japonais (日仏学園 Nichifutsu Gakuen). Since 1997, the student body has increased by nearly 50 students per year, leading to the relocation of some students to two other sites: the Meisho School and the Franco-Japanese Institute. At the start of the 2003 school year, the Primary students were grouped together on the Fujimi site. Secondary students and their teachers moved to the campus of the former Japanese school of Ryuhoku (Taito-Ku). On 7 May 2012, the school officially changed their name from the Lycée franco-japonais to lycée français international de Tokyo and moved to their new campus in Takinogawa.

== Academics ==
The majority of the classes are taught in French. The school follows the French National Curriculum and prepares students for Brevet and French Baccalaureate. In 2023, 97.3% of the students received the Baccalaureat diploma, 88.8% obtained honors.

There is a bilingual French/English section in primary school and a Section européenne for Social Studies section in junior high (lower secondary) school. High school (upper secondary) students who speak Japanese may enroll in the Option international du Baccalauréat (OIB).

== Notable alumni ==
- Marc Panther, French-Japanese singer and lyricist
- Bernard Ackah, Ivorian martial artist
- Mirai Yamamoto, Japanese actress
- Ray Fujita, French-Japanese actor and musician

== See also ==
- France–Japan relations
- Institut franco-japonais de Tokyo (アンスティチュ・フランセ日本)
- Maison franco-japonaise (日仏会館)
- Lycée Français de Kyoto - A French international school in Kyoto, Japan
- List of high schools in Tokyo
- List of junior high schools in Tokyo
- List of elementary schools in Tokyo

Japanese international schools in France:

- Institut Culturel Franco-Japonais – École Japonaise de Paris
- Lycée Konan (defunct)
- Lycée Seijo (defunct)
