= Japanese people in France =

Japonais en France (French) 在フランス日本人 (Japanese)
- (Japan) (France)

Total population
- 36,104 (2022)

Regions with significant populations
- Paris, Marseille, Lyon, Toulouse, Lille, Nice, Strasbourg, Amiens, Montpellier, Nantes, Bordeaux, Tours, Rennes, Versailles

Languages
- Japanese, French

Religion
- Buddhism, Shinto

Related ethnic groups
- Japanese diaspora

Japanese people in France (French: Japonais en France, Japanese: 在フランス日本人 Zai Furansu Nihonjin) are French residents and citizens of Japanese ancestry, including both those who have settled in France permanently and those born in the country, along with a significant community of short-term expatriates who spend at most a few years in the country before moving on.

== History ==
Japanese settlement in France, in contrast to that in Brazil or in the United States, has always consisted of individual sojourners coming to the country for cultural or intellectual reasons rather than economic ones, with little collective mobilisation by the government. Indeed, Japanese leaders of the Meiji period saw France as a symbol of modern civilization, and endeavoured to prevent "men whose respectability and civility they doubted" from settling there.

=== Before World War I ===
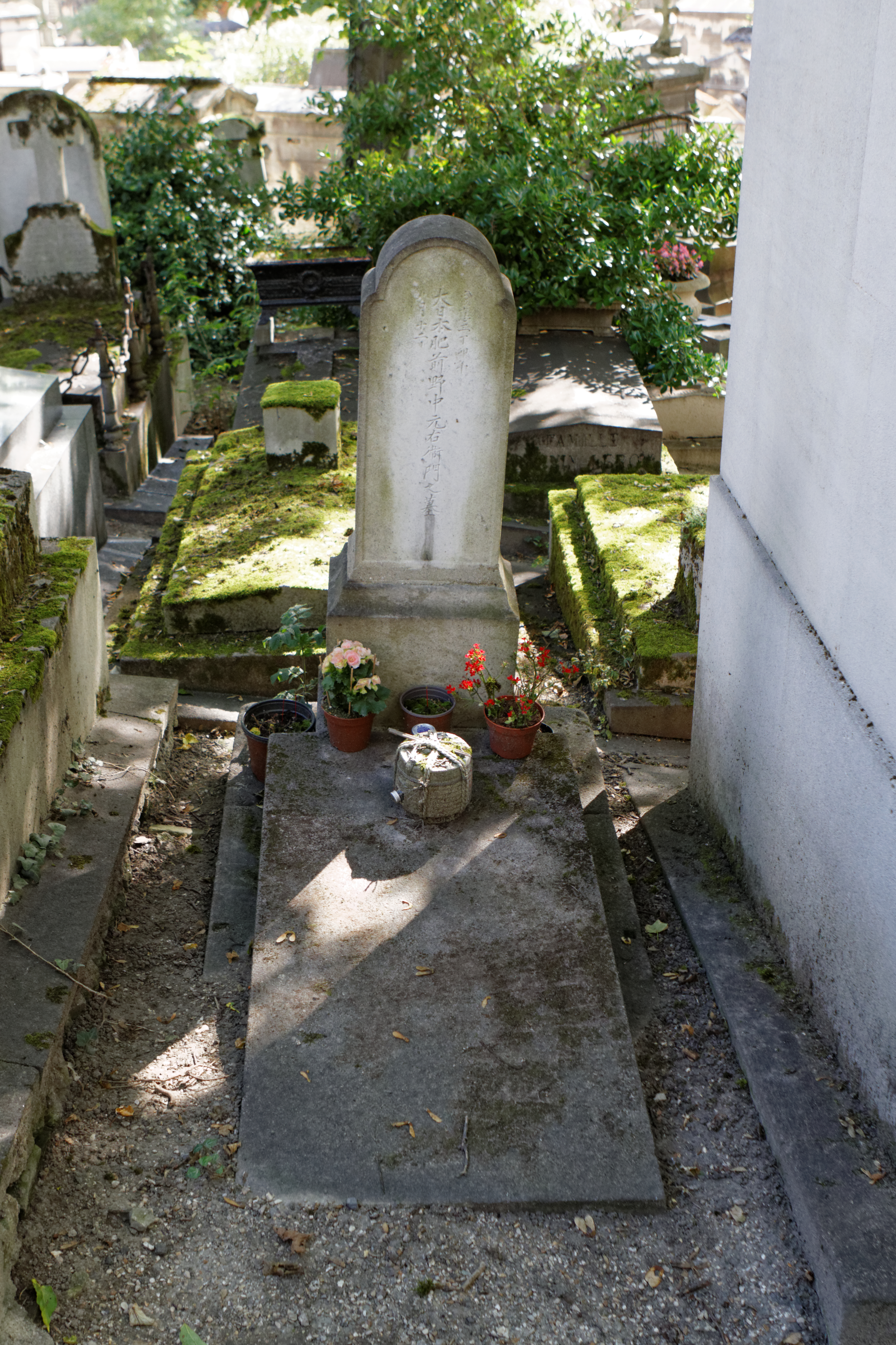
Grave of Nonaka Motoske (?-1867) in Père Lachaise Cemetery

The flow of individual Japanese expatriates to France began as early as the 1870s. For the most part, they came to France for a few years to experience the intellectual and cultural life there, and then return to Japan; their experiences in France are seen as a form of "cultural capital" which boosts their status back in their home country.

=== Between the wars ===
The Japanese expatriate community of the inter-war period is portrayed in Riichi Yokomitsu's novel Ryoshu. The arrival of Japanese expatriates continued at a trickle until the 1930s, when the onset of World War II brought it to a halt.

=== After World War II ===
The post-war Japanese migrants to France largely continued to fit into the mold of highly educated individuals; they consisted of journalists, high officials, scholars, and professionals. 73.6% hold university degrees. The number of students, however, has decreased somewhat as compared to the years between World War I and World War II.

== Culture ==
Japanese expatriates in France largely possess mastery of the French language.

There are several Buddhist temples in France which serve the Japanese community. Most are affiliated with the Zen branch of Mahayana Buddhism.

Japanese in France generally "adapt to the French urban landscape", and for the most part avoid public expressions of ethnic identity which might emphasise their separateness from the French. However, elements of Japanese culture have also been added to the French landscape, notably in Paris, where sushi bars and Japanese restaurants are commonly found.

== Inter-ethnic relations ==
At the turn of the 20th century, the French idea of Japonisme initially played a large role in the French treatment of the Japanese expatriates in their midst: they were seen as representatives of an artistic but vacuous culture, exotic, self-absorbed, and non-political. However, Japan's increasing military aggression in Asia leading up to World War II shattered this image, and increased French suspicion of all Asians, including the Japanese.

Japanese in France in the 1990s and 2000s are considered almost "invisible", in contrast to the far more controversial stream of migrants from North Africa.

The French often feel hostility towards Japan as an economic competitor; however, this hostility does not show up in their treatment of Japanese residents of their country. Yatabe's 2001 survey found that 42.5% of Japanese in France feel the French have a favourable attitude towards them, 31.7% indifferent, and only 25.8% feel they are met with hostility. 42.0% of the French people he surveyed feel favourably towards international marriage with Japanese people, 29.1% indifferent, and 24.3% opposed; the number of those opposed is more than double that regarding intermarriage with Americans or people of any European nation, but below that regarding intermarriage with people of any other non-Western country, and notably less than half the number opposed to intermarriage with Algerians. In contrast, however, 52.4% of Japanese in France surveyed feel "unfavourable" or "highly unfavourable" towards the idea of intermarriage with French people.

== Aggregated communities ==
A little under half of the Japanese in France live in Paris, according to 1996 data from the Japanese embassy. As of 2008 the Japanese in Paris live in a variety of areas, with the largest concentrations in the 15th and 16th arrondissements. Unlike other communities of expatriates from Asia, such as the Chinese, as of 1995, social life for the Japanese tends to centre around their company, rather than their neighbourhood of residence. A number of Japanese businesses and restaurants are concentrated in the Opéra District; however, it is largely a commercial neighbourhood, and few Japanese actually live there. Increasingly, circa 1995, many of the restaurants in the area serving Japanese cuisine are run by immigrants from Cambodia, Thailand, or Vietnam, and target a French customer base.

== Education ==
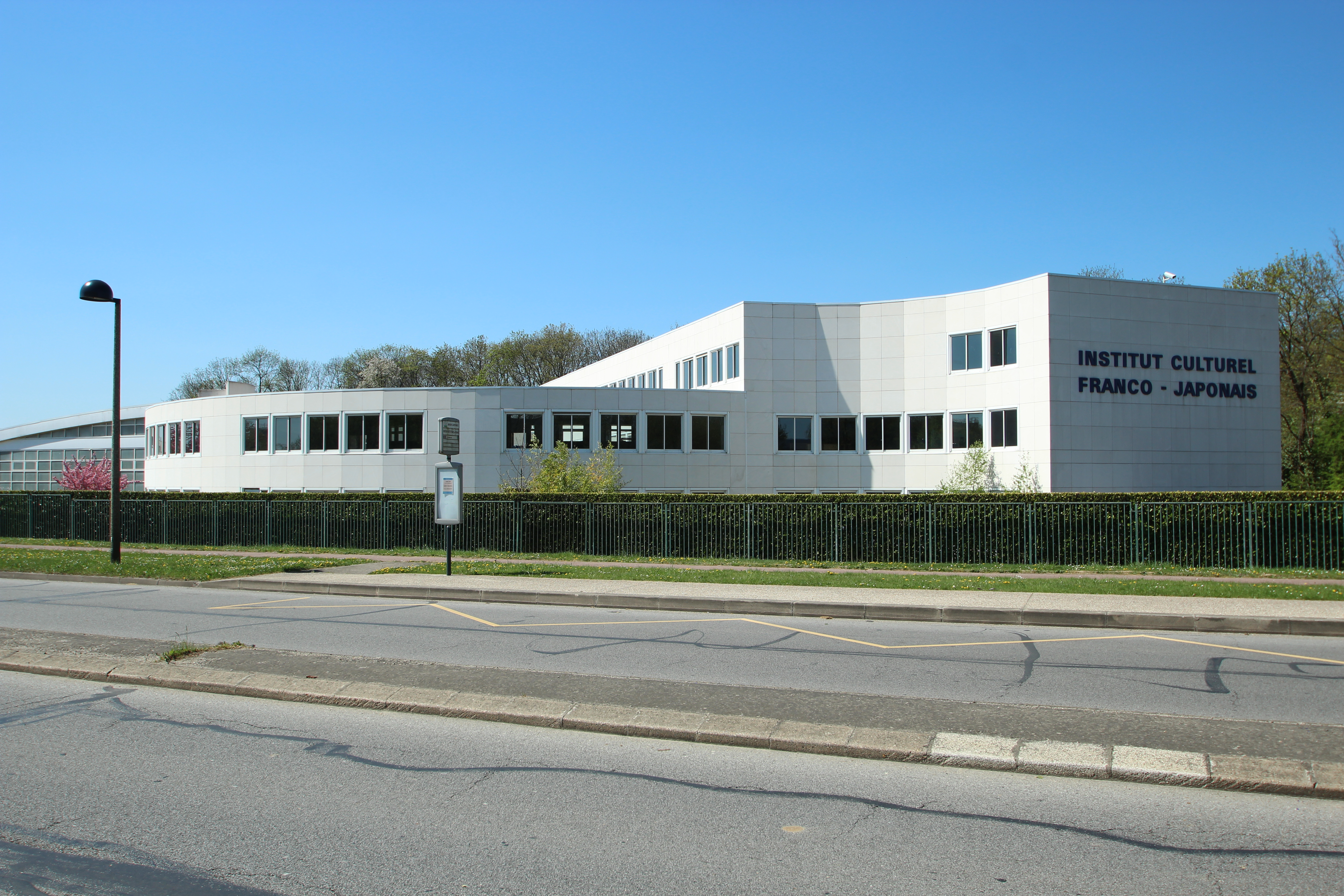
Institut Culturel Franco-Japonais – École Japonaise de Paris

Locations of day schools (nihonjin gakko and shiritsu zaigai kyoiku shisetsu) in France (grey dots represent closed schools)
Locations of supplementary schools (hoshū jugyō kō) in Metropolitan France

Institut Culturel Franco-Japonais – École Japonaise de Paris, a Japanese international school serving elementary and junior high school levels, is located in Montigny-le-Bretonneux. In addition there were two now-defunct Japanese boarding high schools in France, including the Lycée Seijo in Alsace, before its 2005 closure, and the Lycée Konan near Tours, before its 2013 closure.

There are also part-time Japanese educational programmes in Paris, Boulogne-Billancourt, and St. Germain en Laye in the Paris metropolitan area, as well as Bordeaux, Colmar, Grenoble, La Madeleine (near Lille), Labège (near Toulouse), Lyon, Meistratzheim, Marseille, St. Cyr sur Loire, Valbonne (near Nice), and Villeurbanne.

- École complémentaire japonaise de Bordeaux (ボルドー日本語補習授業校 Borudō Nihongo Hoshū Jugyō Kō)
- École complémentaire pour l'enseignement japonais à Colmar (コルマール補習授業校 Korumāru Hoshū Jugyō Kō)
- Japanese Supplementary School in Alsace (French: École complémentaire pour l'enseignement du japonais en Alsace (Strasbourg); German: Japanische Ergänzungsschule im Elsass (Straßburg); Japanese: アルザス補習授業校 Aruzasu Hoshū Jugyō Kō)
  - Operated by Association Pour l'Enseignement du Japonais en Alsace (APEJA; アルザス日本語教育協会).
- École complémentaire des Japonais de Grenoble (グルノーブル補習授業校 Gurunōburu Hoshū Jugyō Kō) - Meylan
- École japonaise du Nord-Pas-de-Calais (ノール=パ・ド・カレー日本人学校 Nōsu Pa do Karē Nihonjin Gakkō) - La Madeleine (near Lille)
- Association pour le développement de la langue et de la culture japonaises (ADLCJ; リヨン補習授業校 Riyon Hoshū Jugyō Kō) Villeurbanne, Greater Lyon) - Formed in 1987
- École japonaise complémentaire de Marseille (マルセイユ日本語補習授業校 Maruseiyu Nihongo Hoshū Jugyō Kō)
- École de langue japonaise de Paris (パリ日本語補習校 Pari Nihongo Hoshūkō)
- Association Éveil Japon (エベイユ学園 Ebeiyu Gakuen) - Boulogne-Billancourt, in the Paris Metropolitan Area
- École complémentaire japonaise de Rennes (レンヌ補習授業校 Rennu Hoshū Jugyō Kō)
- École complémentaire japonaise de Toulouse (トゥールーズ補習授業校 Tūrūzu Hoshū Jugyō Kō)
- École complémentaire japonaise en Touraine (トゥレーヌ補習授業校 Tūrēnu Hoshū Jugyō Kō) - Holds classes for Japanese and Franco-Japanese students at Ecole élémentaire République in Saint-Cyr-sur-Loire. It was established in 1989.
- École complémentaire japonaise de la Côte d'Azur (コートダジュール補習授業校 Kōtodajūru Hoshū Jugyō Kō) - Valbonne (near Nice)

Special collectivities of France:

- École japonaise de la Nouvelle-Calédonie (ニューカレドニア日本語補習校 Nyū Karedonia Nihongo Hoshūkō) - Classes held at the Ecole Sacré-Cœur, Nouméa, operated by the Association Japonaise en Nouvelle-Calédonie (ニューカレドニア日本人会 Nyū Karedonia Nihonjinkai).

In addition the Ministry of Education, Culture, Sports, Science and Technology (MEXT) lists the Japanese section of the Lycée international de Saint-Germain-en-Laye in Saint-Germain-en-Laye in the Paris area; and the Japanese section (リヨン・ジェルラン補習授業校 Riyon Jeruran Hoshū Jugyō Kō "Lyon Gerland Japanese Supplementary School") of the Cité Scolaire Internationale de Lyon in Lyon, as part-time Japanese schools.

== Notable individuals ==
- Giuliano Alesi (born 1999), French racing driver, his mother is Japanese
- Richard von Coudenhove-Kalergi (1894–1972), politician, geopolitician, and philosopher (Originally from Tokyo)
- Olivia de Havilland, (1916–2020), British-American-Japanese actress (Originally from Tokyo)
- Sessue Hayakawa (1886–1973), actor (Originally from Minamibōsō, Chiba)
- Tsuguharu Foujita (1886–1968), painter and printmaker (Originally from Tokyo)
- Aki Kuroda (born 1944), artist (Originally from Kyoto)
- Shūzō Kuki (1888–1941), philosopher (Originally from Tokyo)
- Morio Matsui (1942–2022), artist (Originally from Toyohashi, Aichi)
- Kōjirō Matsukata (1865–1950), businessman and art collector/patron (Originally from Satsuma, Kagoshima)
- Masumi Okada (1935–2006), actor, film producer
- Megumi Satsu (1948–2010), singer (Originally from Sapporo, Hokkaido)
- Kenzo Takada (1939–2020), fashion designer (Originally from Himeji, Hyōgo)
- Yoko Tani (1928–1999), actress and vedette
- Uffie (born 1987), French-American singer, rapper, DJ and fashion designer, her mother is Japanese

== See also ==
- Asian diasporas in France
- French people in Japan
- France–Japan relations
