= List of number-one hits of 1966 (Argentina) =

This is a list of the songs that reached number one in Argentina in 1966, according to Billboard magazine with data provided by Rubén Machado's "Escalera a la fama".

Issue date	Song	Artist(s)
January 1	"Changuito Dios"	Palito Ortega
January 8	"Changuito Dios"	Palito Ortega
January 15	"Changuito Dios"	Palito Ortega
January 22	"Avec"	Charles Aznavour/Franck Pourcel/ Lucio Milena/Elio Roca
January 29	"Avec"	Charles Aznavour/Franck Pourcel/ Lucio Milena/Elio Roca
February 5	"Avec"	Charles Aznavour/Franck Pourcel/ Lucio Milena/Elio Roca
February 12	"Avec"	Charles Aznavour/Franck Pourcel/ Lucio Milena/Elio Roca
February 19	"Avec"	Charles Aznavour/Franck Pourcel/ Lucio Milena/Elio Roca
February 26	"Avec"	Charles Aznavour/Franck Pourcel/ Lucio Milena/Elio Roca
March 5	"La playa"	Claude Ciari/Aldo Perricone/Nancy Li/ Lucio Milena/Dany Montano
March 12	"La playa"	Claude Ciari/Aldo Perricone/Nancy Li/ Lucio Milena/Dany Montano
March 19	"El corralero"	El Chango Nieto/Los Cantores de Quilla Huasi/Ginette Acevedo/ Hernán Figueroa Reyes/Los Trovadores del Norte
March 26	"El corralero"	El Chango Nieto/Los Cantores de Quilla Huasi/Ginette Acevedo/ Hernán Figueroa Reyes/Los Trovadores del Norte
April 16	"Michelle"	Billy Vaughn/Bárbara & Dick with Los Iracundos/ Los Shakers/Los Vip's/The Beatles
April 23	"Michelle"	Billy Vaughn/Bárbara & Dick with Los Iracundos/ Los Shakers/Los Vip's/The Beatles
April 30	"Michelle"	Billy Vaughn/Bárbara & Dick with Los Iracundos/ Los Shakers/Los Vip's/The Beatles
May 7	"Michelle"	Billy Vaughn/Bárbara & Dick with Los Iracundos/ Los Shakers/Los Vip's/The Beatles
May 14	"Michelle"	Billy Vaughn/Bárbara & Dick with Los Iracundos/Los Shakers/Los Vip's/ The Beatles/Vincent Morocco/Mr. Trombone/Gino Bonetti
May 21	"Ninguno me puede juzgar (Nessuno mi puo' giudicare)"	Caterina Caselli/Gene Pitney/Violeta Rivas/ Elio Roca/Aldo Perricone
May 28	"Ninguno me puede juzgar (Nessuno mi puo' giudicare)"	Caterina Caselli/Gene Pitney/Violeta Rivas/ Elio Roca/Aldo Perricone
June 4	"Ninguno me puede juzgar (Nessuno mi puo' giudicare)"	Caterina Caselli/Gene Pitney/Violeta Rivas/ Elio Roca/Aldo Perricone
June 18	"Manuel Benítez El cordobés"	Dalida/Franck Pourcel/Pierre Selin/ Richard Davis/Los Nocturnos
June 25	"Manuel Benítez El cordobés"	Dalida/Franck Pourcel/Pierre Selin/ Richard Davis/Los Nocturnos
July 2	"Girl"	The Beatles/Los Inn/ Los Vip's/Peppino di Capri
July 9	"Girl"	The Beatles/Los Inn/ Los Vip's/Peppino di Capri
July 16	"Girl"	The Beatles/Los Inn/ Los Vip's/Peppino di Capri
July 23	"Juanita Banana"	The Peels/Juan Montego/Míster Trombón/ Los Hills/J.R. Corvington/Tony Scott
August 6	"Juanita Banana"	The Peels/Juan Montego/Míster Trombón/ Los Hills/J.R. Corvington/Tony Scott
August 13	"These Boots Are Made For Walkin'"	Nancy Sinatra/Los Inn/Cinty Li
August 20	"These Boots Are Made For Walkin'"	Nancy Sinatra/Los Inn/Cinty Li
August 27	"These Boots Are Made For Walkin'"	Nancy Sinatra/Los Inn/Cinty Li
September 3	"These Boots Are Made For Walkin'"	Nancy Sinatra/Los Inn/Cinty Li
September 10	"Monday, Monday"	The Mamas & the Papas
September 24	"Monday, Monday"	The Mamas & the Papas
October 15	"Strangers in the Night"	Frank Sinatra/Bert Kaempfert/Hugo Santana Sergio Más/The Living Brass/Dalida
October 22	"Guantanamera"	Pete Seeger/Bárbara y Dick with Los Iracundos/ Luis Bravo/Mr. Trombone
October 29	"Strangers in the Night"	Frank Sinatra/Bert Kaempfert/Hugo Santana Sergio Más/The Living Brass/Dalida
November 5	"Lara's Theme"	Al Korvin/Ray Conniff/Roger Williams The Brass Ring/Cuerdas Cantantes/Michel Monot
November 12	"Lara's Theme"	Al Korvin/Ray Conniff/Roger Williams The Brass Ring/Cuerdas Cantantes/Michel Monot
November 26	"Yellow Submarine"	The Beatles
December 3	"Yellow Submarine"	The Beatles
December 17	"A Man and a Woman"	Eddie Barclay/Franck Pourcel
December 24	"A Man and a Woman"	Eddie Barclay/Franck Pourcel
December 31	"A Man and a Woman"	Eddie Barclay/Franck Pourcel

== See also ==
- 1966 in music
