= Hôtel de Ville, Montigny-le-Bretonneux =

Town hall in Montigny-le-Bretonneux, France

Hôtel de Ville
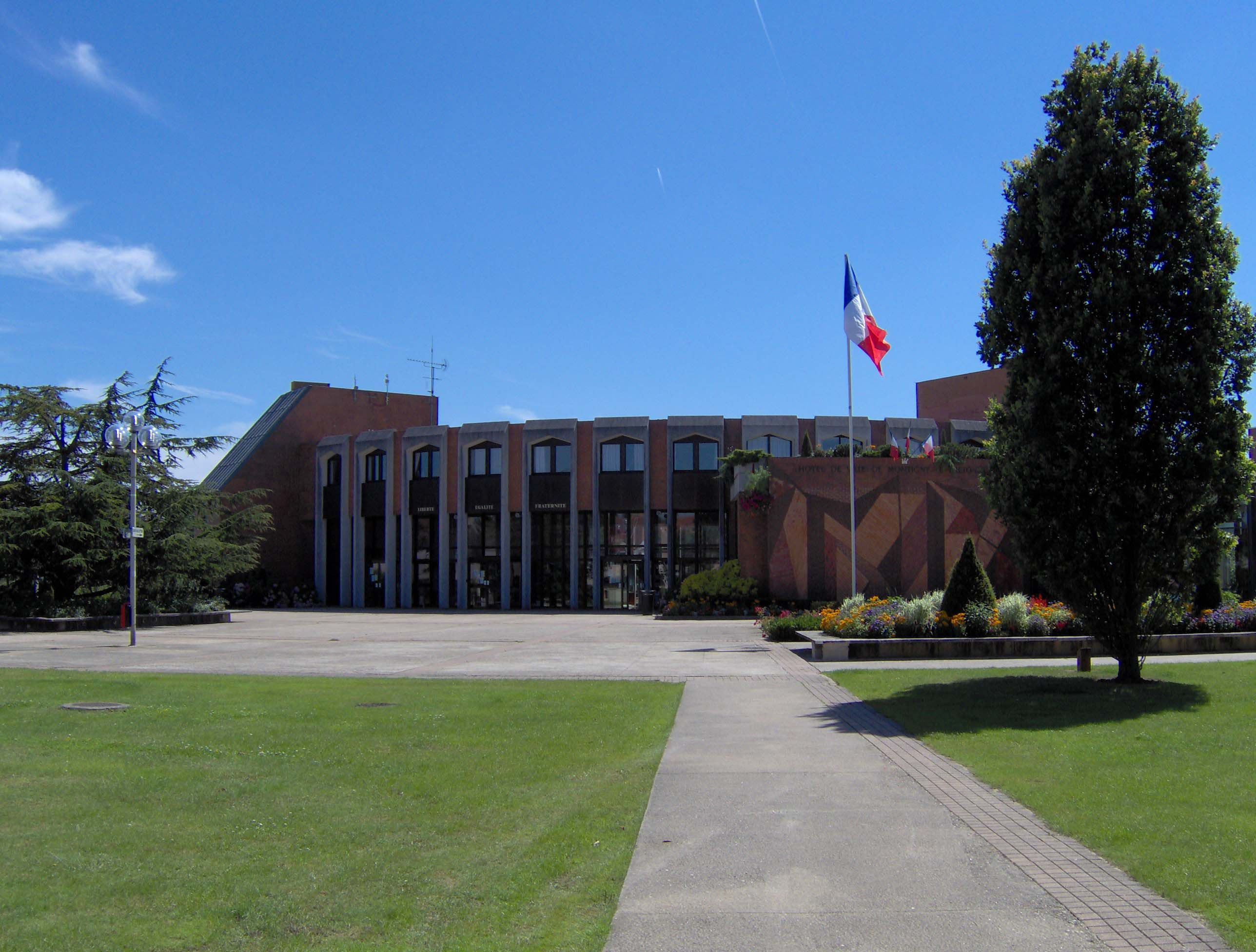
- The main frontage of the Hôtel de Ville in July 2007
- Interactive map of the Hôtel de Ville area

General information
- Type: City hall
- Architectural style: Modern style
- Location: Montigny-le-Bretonneux, France
- Coordinates: 48.7695°N 2.0377°E
- Completed: 1987

Design and construction
- Architect: Henri Beauclair

The Hôtel de Ville (French pronunciation: [otɛl də vil], City Hall) is a municipal building in Montigny-le-Bretonneux, Yvelines, in the western suburbs of Paris, standing on Rue de la Mare-aux-Carats.

== History ==
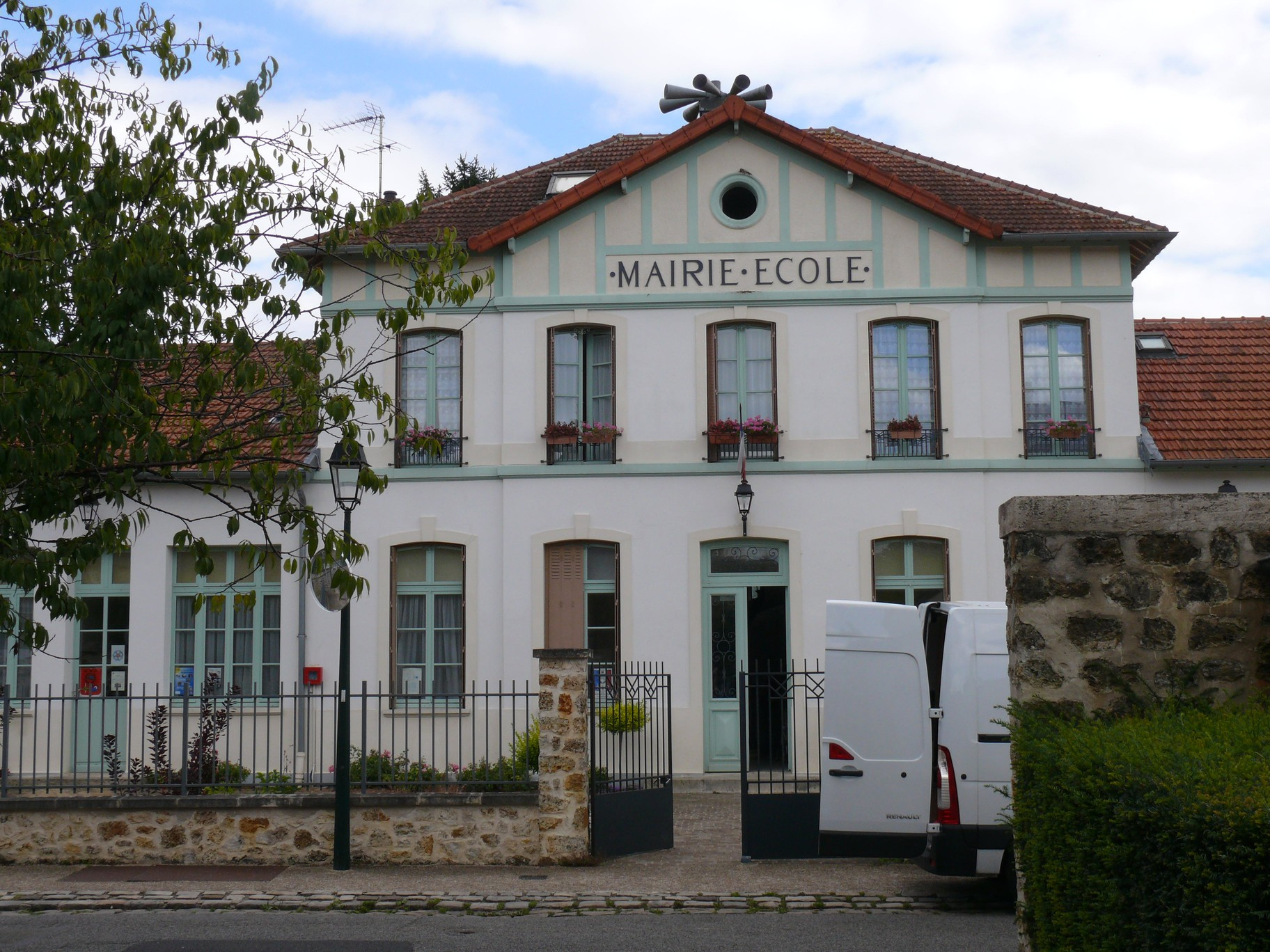
The old town hall

For much of the 19th century, Montigny-le-Bretonneux was a small village with a population of around 250 people. In the early 1860s, following the implementation of the Jules Ferry laws which required the provision of free education for all children, the town council led by the mayor, Vincent Notta, decided to establish a combined school and town hall. The site they selected was on the east side of what is now Rue de l'Ancienne Mairie. The building was designed in the neoclassical style, built in brick with a cement render finish and was completed in 1868.

The design involved a symmetrical main frontage of 11 bays facing onto the street. The central section of five bays, which was two-storey, featured a segmental headed doorway with a stone surround and a keystone in the central bay. The other bays on the ground floor of the central section and all the bays on the first floor were fenestrated by segmental headed windows with stone surrounds and keystones. Above the central three bays, there was a gable which was part clad with timber and contained an oculus in the centre. The wings of three bays each, which were single storey, contained entrance doorways for the children, with one wing for boys and the other for girls. Internally, the ground floor contained the classrooms, while the first floor was reserved for the teacher's living accommodation. After the building was no longer required for municipal services, it became a community centre and, in the early 21st century, it became home to the Montigny Bridge Club.

In the early 1980s, after a significant increase in population, the council led by the mayor, Nicolas About, decided to commission a modern town hall. The site they selected, to the east of the old village centre, was in the Sourderie district which formed part of an area identified for commercial and residential development. A design competition was held, and an architect was selected. The new building was designed by Henri Beauclair in the modern style, built in brick and glass and was officially opened by the Minister of the Interior, Charles Pasqua, on 25 May 1987.

The design involved three concentric circular structures, with a segment of the outer structure on the northwest side forming an entrance block, a middle structure forming the municipal offices and the inner structure, at the core of the complex, containing the Salle du Conseil (council chamber).

== Sources ==
- Chauvin-Lechaptois, Monique (1 November 2006). Montigny-le-Bretonneux – Naissance d'une ville. Cliomedia. ISBN 978-2909522258.
