= Institut de formation de Saint-Quentin-en-Yvelines =

Islamic school in France

- Montigny-le-Bretonneux, Yvelines; France

Information
- Enrollment: 100 (2014)

Institut de formation de Saint-Quentin-en-Yvelines (French pronunciation: [ɛ̃stity də fɔʁmasjɔ̃ də sɛ̃ kɑ̃tɛ̃ ɑ̃.n‿ivlin], IFSQY) is a Muslim private junior and senior high school/high school and sixth-form college (collège and lycée) in Montigny-le-Bretonneux, Yvelines, France, in the Paris metropolitan area. It is within the Saint-Quentin-en-Yvelines new town.

As of 2014 it is the only Muslim private school in the Académie de Versailles.

As of 2009 the head of the institution was Slimane Bousanna. It was established in a former taxation building.

As of 2014 the school had about 100 students. The rector of the department of Yvelines refused to contract with the school.
