= Canton of Montigny-le-Bretonneux =

Coordinates: 48.77°N 2.04°E

The canton of Montigny-le-Bretonneux is an administrative division of the Yvelines department, northern France. Its borders were not modified at the French canton reorganisation which came into effect in March 2015. Its seat is in Montigny-le-Bretonneux.

It consists of the following communes:

1. Guyancourt
2. Montigny-le-Bretonneux
