= Lycée Descartes de Montigny le Bretonneux =

School in Montigny-le-Bretonneux, France

Coordinates: 48.7653°N 2.0388°E

Lycée Descartes de Montigny le Bretonneux (French pronunciation: [lise dekaʁt də mɔ̃tiɲi lə bʁətɔnø]) is a senior high school located in the Sourderie area, in Montigny-le-Bretonneux, Yvelines, France, in the Paris metropolitan area.

It opened in 1980 with 60 students, and at the time it was integrated with the Collège Hélène Boucher junior high school. As of autumn 2014 it had 940 students, and in 2023 it has a little more than 1000 students.
