= French people in Japan =

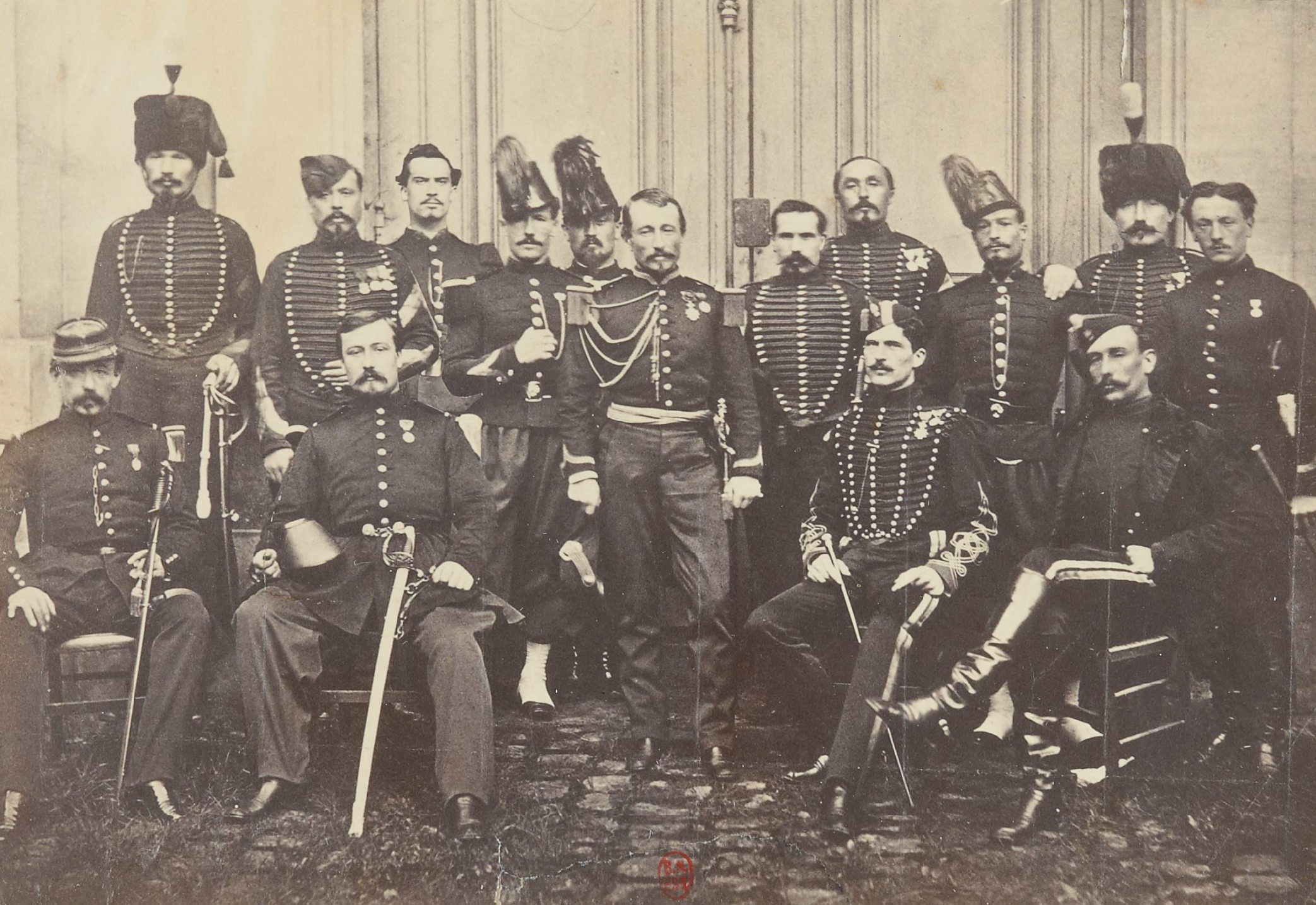
- Members of the first French military mission to Japan in 1867

Total population
- 17,088 (in December, 2025)

Regions with significant populations
- Tokyo · Yokohama · Sapporo

Languages
- French · Japanese

Religion
- Predominantly Roman Catholicism, Shinto · Protestantism · Judaism

Related ethnic groups
- French diaspora

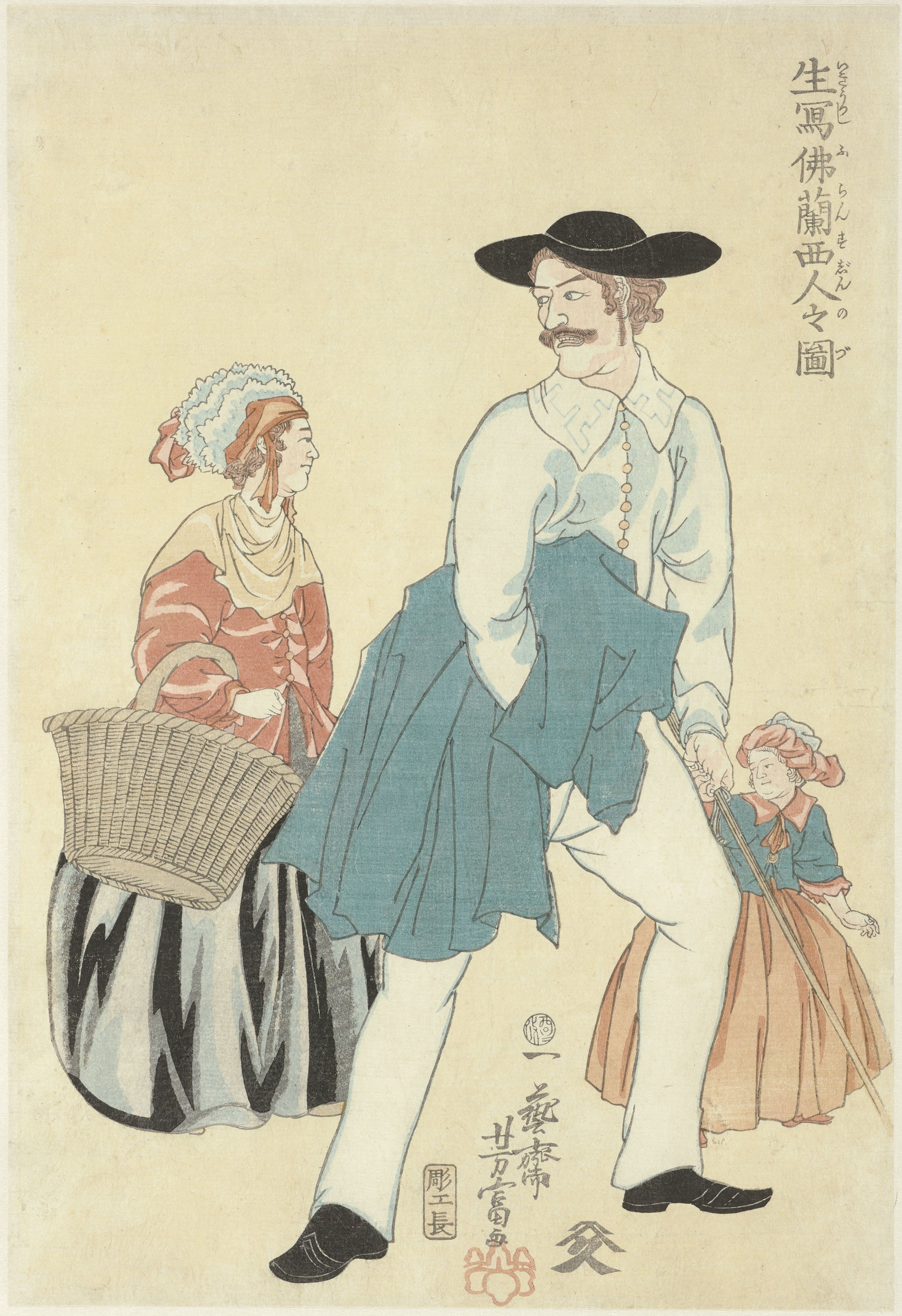
A French family in Japan, 1861

In December 2025, there were 17,088 registered French citizens in Japan.

== Overview ==
The French community in Japan has been steadily increasing, rising by more than 35% in the last decade. French expatriates who are working in Japan with leading foreign companies came from many different industries such as chemicals and crystal-ware. As far as inbound tourism from France is concerned, France ranked at 15th place in 2018, with 304,900 French tourists visiting Japan.

There are four bilingual schools, 60 cultural associations, and over 700 companies in Japan.

From 17,088 French people in Japan about 8,415 of them live in Tokyo alone, which makes it the largest European population in Tokyo. Many of them work in a French restaurant or at pastry. The numbers of pastries led by French pastry chef in Japan has increased since the past 10 years.

== Notable Japanese people of French descent ==
- Claude Ciari, musician
- Hisaki Kato, kickboxer and MMA fighter
- Minami Hinase, model and actress
- Nozomi de Lencquesaing, actor
- Hikari Mitsushima, actress
- Michel Miyazawa, footballer
- Maria Ozawa, AV (adult video) performer and model
- Marc Panther, rapper
- Rinka, actress and tarento
- Erika Sawajiri, actress, model and musician
- Erika Sema, tennis player
- Yurika Sema, tennis player
- Christel Takigawa, TV announcer and TV News presenter

=== Fictional people ===
- Arsène Lupin III, main protagonist of Lupin III manga
- Charlotte Dunois from Infinite Stratos
- Jean Pierre Polnareff from JoJo's Bizarre Adventure
- Frederica Miyamoto from Idolmaster: Cinderella Girls

== See also ==
- France–Japan relations
- Japanese people in France
- Gaijin
