= Megumi Satsu =

Megumi Satsu (Japanese: 薩 めぐみ, 14 February 1948, Sapporo, Japan – 18 October 2010, Paris) was a French-Japanese singer.

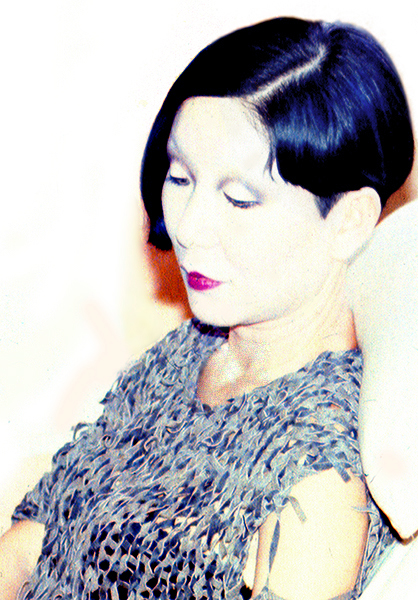
Megumi Satsu (薩 めぐみ)

== Life and career ==
Megumi Satsu released a few singles in Japan early in her career and then moved to France at the end of the seventies. She was discovered by Jacques Prévert who wrote an album of new songs especially for her. Some additional albums were recorded in the following years with the collaboration of some of the most famous French writers; Roland Topor, Jean Baudrillard, William Cliff and Frédéric Mitterrand (who was the Minister of Culture in France under Nicolas Sarkozy's presidency).

These recordings were known to be released in collaboration with musicians like Serge Perathoner or Patrick Vasori. Megumi's alternative repertoire and her expressionist interpretation brought her recognition amongst the alternative underground generation, with her style being compared to that of Marlène Dietrich.

She had the opportunity to sing some French poems written by the famous writer and poet Jacques Prévert. Just a few years before dying, Prévert saw Satsu on TV; he was fascinated by her voice and her personality. He told his wife that Satsu would be perfect for interpreting some of his unedited texts. Prévert's wife contacted Megumi Satsu after her husband died and she took on the project.

Megumi Satsu was a friend of Jean Baudrillard, the famous French sociologist. He also wrote two songs for her, "Motel Suicide" and "Lifting Zodiacal".

Roland Topor also wrote two songs about her, "Monte dans mon Ambulance" et "Je m'aime".

Megumi Satsu mostly performed in French, though she did record some songs in Japanese and English. Megumi Satsu was also inspired by the 1930s, such as interpreting Bertold Brecht in French.

== Discography ==
- 1979 : Megumi Satsu chante Prévert (LP)
- 1980 : Zozo Lala, Kaze/Normandie (45T)
- 1980 : Je m'aime (LP)
- 1984 : Silicone Lady (Motel suicide) (LP)
- 1986 : Give back my soul (maxi 45T)
- 1986 : Silicone Lady (Motel suicide) (reissue)
- 1987 : Chante Prévert (reissue)
- 1991 : Du vent à la folie (CD single 2 tracks)
- 2002 : Sombre dimanche (compilation, 1 track)
- 2006 : Chansons littéraires des années 30
- 2008 : Complete discography digitally reissued
- 2008 : En concert au Bataclan 1984
- 2009 : Après ma mort
- 2011 : Remixes VOL1
- 2011 : Remixes VOL2
- 2011 : Je m'aime, en concert (1980)
- 2011 : Give back my soul, (The Complete Story)
- 2011 : Ma petite annonce (7 versions)
- 2011 : Chansons inédites et versions alternatives
- 2012 : Rebirth (Remixes vs DJ Wen!ngs)
- 2014 : Megumi Satsu et Claude Rolland interprètent Cocteau, Brecht et Prévert (1974)
- 2014 : Silicone Lady (Motel Suicide) Deluxe Expanded
- 2015 : Stage Tokyo 1982 (live recording)
- 2015 : Prévert Récital Tokyo 1982 (live recording)
