= Saint-Cyr-sur-Loire =

- Commune
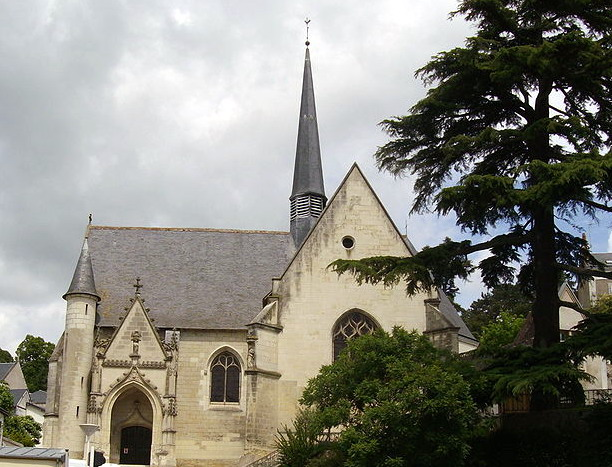
- Church of Sainte Julitte

- Coat of arms
- Location of Saint-Cyr-sur-Loire
- Location within France Location within Centre-Val de Loire
- Coordinates: 47°23′56″N 0°40′02″E
- Country: France
- Region: Centre-Val de Loire
- Department: Indre-et-Loire
- Arrondissement: Tours
- Canton: Saint-Cyr-sur-Loire
- Intercommunality: Tours Métropole Val de Loire

Government
  - Mayor (2020–2026): Philippe Briand
- Area^{1}: 13.5 km^{2} (5.2 sq mi)
- Highest elevation: 101 m (331 ft)
- Lowest elevation: 45 m (148 ft)
- Population (2023): 17,029
  - Density: 1,260/km^{2} (3,270/sq mi)
- Time zone: UTC+01:00 (CET)
  - Summer (DST): UTC+02:00 (CEST)
- INSEE/Postal code: 37214 /37540
- ^{1} French Land Register data, which excludes lakes, ponds, glaciers > 1 km^{2} (0.386 sq mi or 247 acres) and river estuaries.

Saint-Cyr-sur-Loire (French pronunciation: [sɛ̃ siʁ syʁ lwaʁ], literally Saint-Cyr on Loire) is a commune in the department of Indre-et-Loire in central France.

It is located northwest of Tours on the other side of the Loire. It is the third largest city in the Indre-et-Loire department, behind Tours and Joué-lès-Tours.

== Population ==
Historical population

Year	Pop.	±% p.a.
1793	1,500	—
1800	1,295	−2.08%
1806	1,118	−2.42%
1821	1,329	+1.16%
1831	1,434	+0.76%
1836	1,484	+0.69%
1841	1,620	+1.77%
1846	1,862	+2.82%
1851	1,848	−0.15%
1856	2,113	+2.72%
1861	1,883	−2.28%
1866	1,984	+1.05%
1872	1,933	−0.43%
1876	2,220	+3.52%
1881	2,384	+1.44%
1886	2,436	+0.43%
1891	2,419	−0.14%
1896	2,539	+0.97%
1901	2,648	+0.84%

Year	Pop.	±% p.a.
1906	2,699	+0.38%
1911	2,740	+0.30%
1921	2,939	+0.70%
1926	3,114	+1.16%
1931	3,593	+2.90%
1936	4,418	+4.22%
1946	5,652	+2.49%
1954	6,974	+2.66%
1962	9,547	+4.00%
1968	11,211	+2.71%
1975	12,478	+1.54%
1982	14,413	+2.08%
1990	15,161	+0.63%
1999	16,100	+0.67%
2007	15,975	−0.10%
2012	16,133	+0.20%
2017	15,960	−0.22%
2023	17,029	+1.09%

Source: EHESS and INSEE (1968-2023)

== Education ==
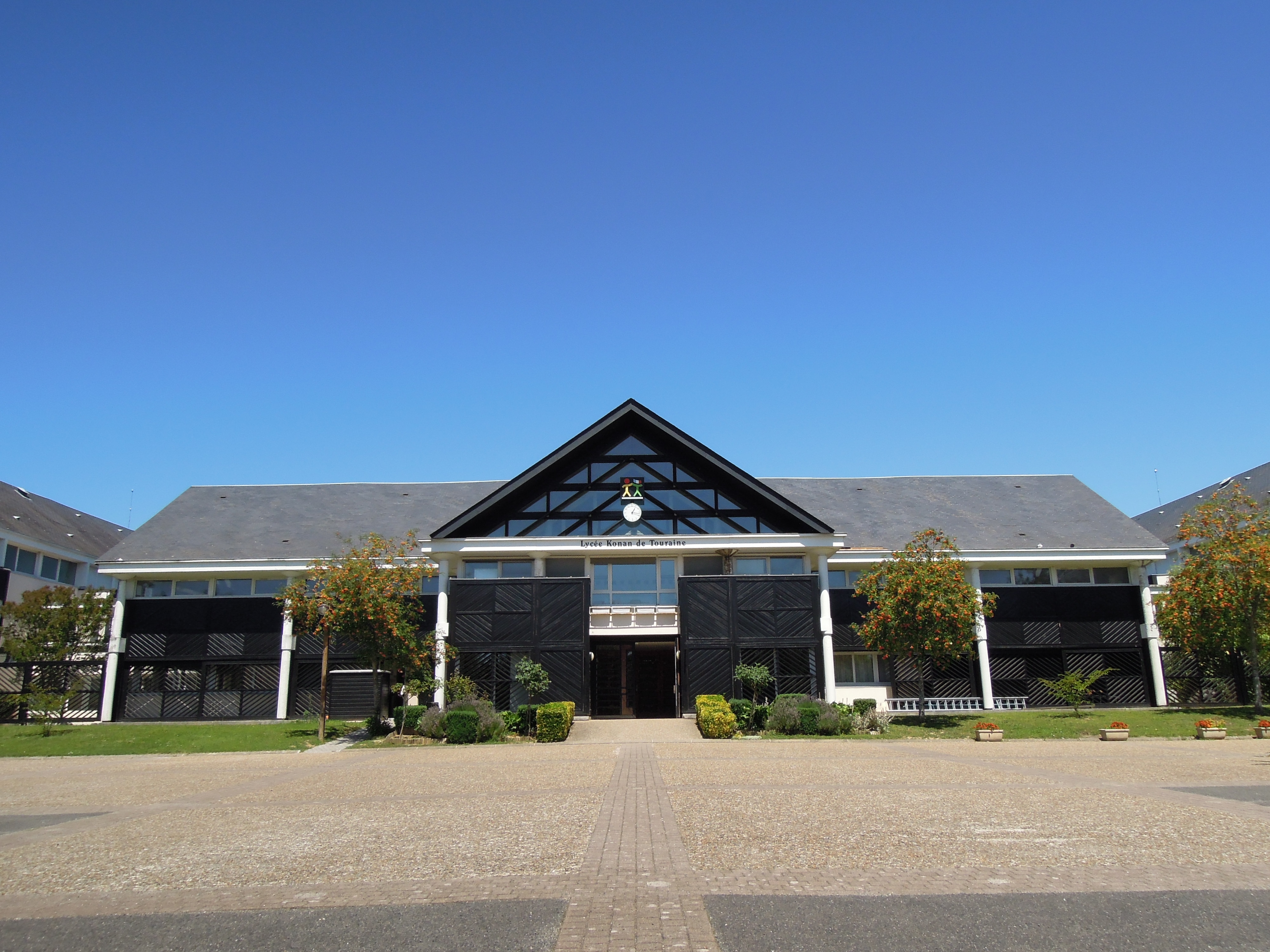
Lycée Konan

The commune has:

- Five public and private preschools (écoles maternelles) with a combined total of 500 students: Jean Moulin, Honoré de Balzac-Anatole France, Charles Perrault, Périgourd, and Saint-Joseph (private)
- Four public elementary schools with a combined total of about 700 students: République, Roland Engerand, Honoré de Balzac – Anatole France, and Périgourd; and 140 students at the Saint-Joseph private elementary
- Two junior high schools (collèges) with a combined total of 700 students: Henri Bergson and Béchéllerie

Two senior high schools/sixth-form colleges in Tours, Lycée Choiseul and Lycée Jacques de Vaucanson, serve students in this commune.

The Lycée Konan de Touraine-France, a private Japanese international school, operated in the commune from 1991 to 2013.

The École Japonaise Compleméntaire en Touraine (トゥレーヌ補習授業校 Tūrēnu Hoshū Jugyō Kō), a part-time Japanese supplementary school, is held in the École Republique in Saint-Cyr-sur-Loire.

== International relations ==
Saint-Cyr-sur-Loire is twinned with:

Katrineholm, Sweden, since 24 June 1979; Meinerzhagen, Germany, since 12 April 1987; Newark-on-Trent, United Kingdom, since 11 April 1993	Valls, Spain, since 11 April 1999; Ptuj, Slovenia, 1999; Morphou, Cyprus, since 19 October 2002

== Personalities ==
- Anatole France died here.

== See also ==
- Communes of the Indre-et-Loire department
