= Lycée Konan =

- フランス甲南学園トゥレーヌ

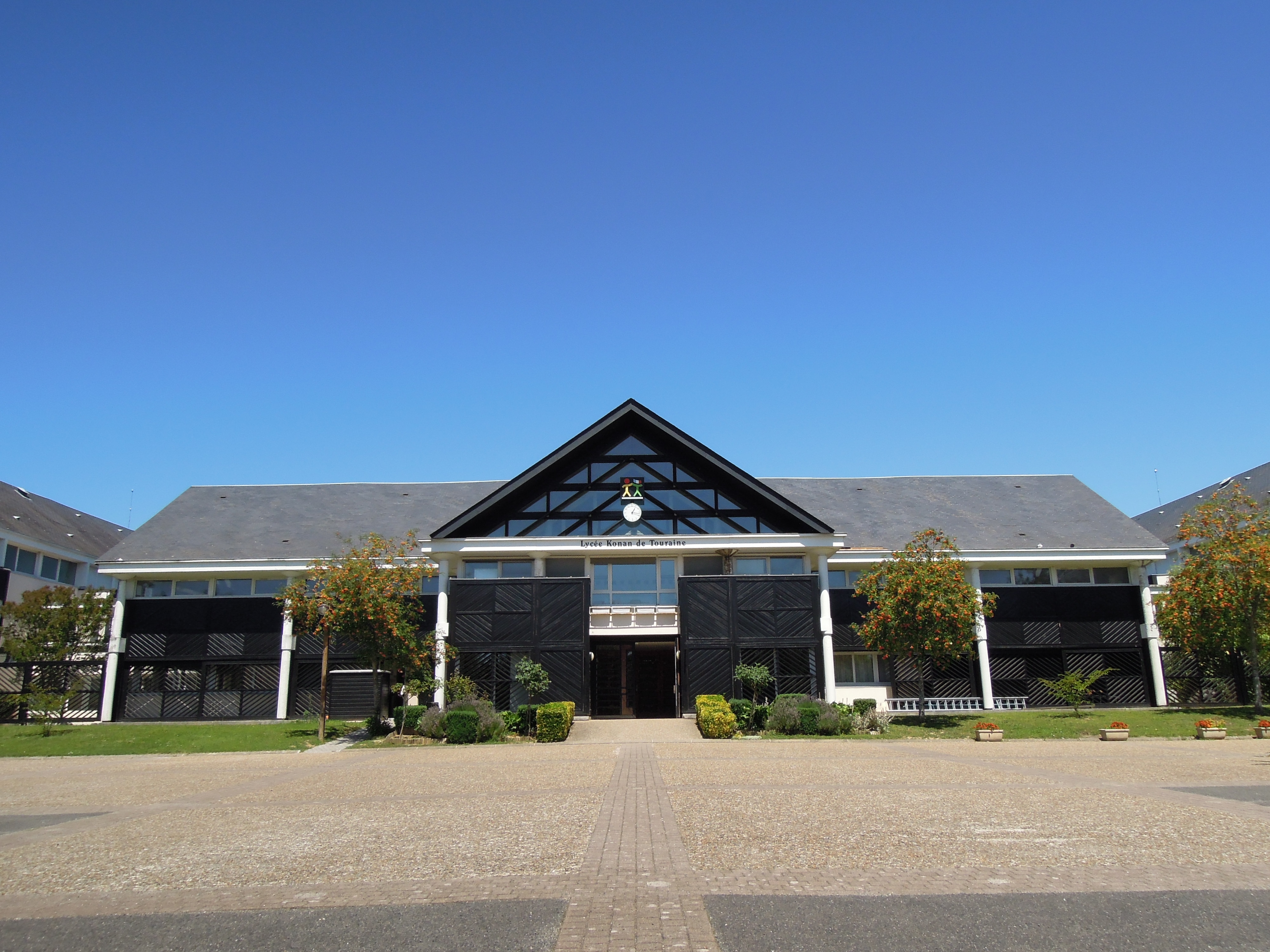
- Former main building of the school

Location
- 57-63 Rue de la Gaudiniere; 37540 Saint-Cyr-sur-Loire; France
- Coordinates: 47.4145°N 0.6547°E

Information
- Type: Private high school
- Opened: 1991
- Closed: 2013
- Website: t-konan.jp

The Lycée Konan de Touraine-France (フランス甲南学園トゥレーヌ, Furansu Kōnan Gakuen Turēnu), previously the Lycée-Collège Konan de Touraine (トゥレーヌ甲南学園高等部・中等部, Turēnu Kōnan Gakuen Kōtōbu Chūtōbu), was a Japanese international high school located in Saint-Cyr-sur-Loire, France, near Tours.

The school, in the Bechellerie neighbourhood, was dependent on the Konan Foundation (甲南学園 Konan Gakuen), which operates Konan University, and therefore was an overseas branch of a Japanese private school, or a Shiritsu zaigai kyoiku shisetsu (私立在外教育施設). The school, which had both junior high school and senior high school departments, had over 600 students. The 5,000-square-metre (54,000 sq ft) school building was located on a 12,000-square-metre (130,000 sq ft) plot of land. The school also maintained an 800-square-metre (8,600 sq ft) dojo.

During the school's existence, some students were from Japanese families living in Paris. At the time of closing the school's director was Osamu Yokoyama (横山 理 Yokoyama Osamu). As of 2012 the school's operating budget exceeded 3 million euros annually.

== History ==
The school opened in 1991. Yokoyama said that the school was created to accommodate children of Japanese business executives stationed in Europe. Yokoyama said that the president of the Konan Foundation chose to station the school in France because he wanted to give the students the dream as taught by Descartes and because he was a Francophile. As of 1991 the school had 240 Japanese students. In its English classes and extracurricular classes such as music and sports, the school also served 320 French students, and the Japanese and French students intermingled in these special classes.

Due to an economic crisis in Japan, the number of students at the school decreased. In 2010 the foundation decided to close the school and entered negotiations with the commune of Saint-Cyr-sur-Loire on what to do with the land. In 2012 the school announced it was closing effective Spring 2013. Yokoyama said that the school was closing due to economic reasons. The commune acquired the property for 1.5 million euros, and the school donated its dojo to the city. On Tuesday 23 October 2012 the député-maire (a mayor who is also a member of the National Assembly of France) of the commune, Philippe Briand, signed the deed to the facility.

== Student life ==
The school maintained separate dormitories for boys and girls and the dormitories had dedicated house parents.

== See also ==
- Japanese people in France

French international schools in Japan:

- Lycée Français International de Tokyo
- Lycée Français de Kyoto
