= Lycée Seijo =

Defunct Japanese boarding school in Kientzheim, France

- アルザス成城学園

Location
- 8, route d'Ammerschwihr, 68240 KIENTZHEIM, FRANCE; Kientzheim; France; 48.1310°N 7.2876989°E

Information
- Type: Private high school
- Established: 1986
- Closed: 2005
- Website: perso.calixo.net/~lycee-seijo/

The Lycée Seijo d'Alsace (アルザス成城学園, Aruzasu Seijō Gakuen) was a Japanese boarding high school in Kientzheim (now a part of Kaysersberg-Vignoble), Haut-Rhin, in the Alsace region of France, near Colmar. It was operated by Seijo Gakuen, an educational society affiliated with Seijo University, and therefore was an overseas branch of a Japanese private school, or a Shiritsu zaigai kyoiku shisetsu (私立在外教育施設).

== History ==
In the 1980s, officials in the Alsace region sent an invitation for a Japanese school to establish itself there as a way of attracting Japanese companies to establish operations in the region. The director of the Alsace Development Agency, Andre Klein, received contacts from several Japanese educational institutions after he had asked a Nihon Keizai Shimbun reporter to write an article about a possible site for an overseas Japanese boarding school: a former convent in Kientzheim. Seijo Gakuen, the organization controlling Seijo University, accepted the offer. It wanted to establish a Japanese school in 1987 to celebrate its 70th anniversary. In 1984 negotiations to establish the school finished successfully.

The school opened in April 1986. The first principal was Jokichi Moroga. After the school opened Sony decided to open a factory in Alsace. Other Japanese companies including Ricoh followed.

In 1990 and 1991, the school had 180 students in grades 7 through 12. The school's enrollment steadily fell due to the declining Japanese birthrate and Japan's contracting economic presence in France due to the Lost Decades. On 11 February 2005, the school held its final graduation ceremony with 13 students graduating. The school graduated a total of 556 students during its existence.

The former site of the school is now home to the European Centre for Japanese Studies in Alsace (French: Centre Européen d'Etudes Japonaises d'Alsace (CEEJA), Japanese: アルザス・欧州日本学研究所 Aruzasu Ōshū Nihongaku Kenkyūsho).

== Curriculum ==
Lycée Seijo used the same curriculum as the Seijo Gakuen Junior High School and High School, with the courses taught in Japanese.

== Student body ==
During the school's lifetime, according to the Western Society for French History, the "core" of the student body consisted of children of executives working for offices of Japanese multinational companies such as Sharp Corporation and Sony in the Alsace region. In addition, some students were from Japanese families living in Paris. Other students' families lived in other places including Germany, Italy, the Soviet Union, other areas in Europe, Africa, and Australia. Some students' families lived in Japan, and the families sent them to Lycée Seijo to gain experience living outside Japan. Some students' families lived elsewhere in Asia. As of 1990, about 66% of the students had families resident outside Japan while the remainder had families resident in Japan.

== Student life ==
All students lived in the school dormitories. Karl Schoenberger of the Los Angeles Times wrote that the Seijo students "on the whole" were "isolated" at the school, even though during athletic meetings they had some interaction with French children.

== Extracurricular activities and community relations ==
Because the school, with about 200 Japanese students and teachers at the time of opening, was located in a community of only 800, the school leadership took steps to develop good relationships with the host community. The student body participated in the village-sponsored marathon and the school held "open house" days for the local community.

The school established a Japanese cultural center in nearby Colmar, which housed books and printed materials in Japan, hosted lectures about Japan and held Japanese film screenings.

== Notable students ==
- The second eldest son of Tsutomu Hata, who was one of the first to graduate from this school

== See also ==
- Japanese people in France

French international schools in Japan:

- Lycée Français International de Tokyo
- Lycée Français de Kyoto
