= Look Japan =

English language magazine published in Japan

Look Japan (ルックジャパン, Rukku Japan) was an English language magazine published from Japan. It was created to introduce Japanese culture to expatriate foreigners who were unfamiliar with the country.

== History and profile ==
Look Japan was established in 1953 by Takenori Kimura (木村 武則 Kimura Takenori). It was published in English, Chinese, and Spanish editions. The offices of the publisher, Look Japan Ltd, were in the Asahi Seimei Hibiya Building in Yurakucho, Chiyoda, Tokyo.

Jay Brushart of the Portsmouth Daily Times said that the format of Look Japan was similar to that of TIME. Ed Gibson of the Harlan Daily Enterprise said that Look Japan was "a slick publication, a lot like People that offers the non-Japanese a most interesting look at the country and its people." As of 1991, it was published in Singapore.
