= Lycée français international de Kyoto =

Lycée Français International de Kyoto
- 京都国際フランス学園

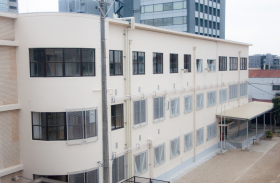

Location
- 411 Motoshinmeicho; Tominokojidôri Gojo agaru Shimogyô-ku; Kyoto, Japan, 600-8065; 34.9969192°N 135.7646478°E

Information
- School type: Private School Under Contract
- Founded: 1996; 30 years ago
- School board: APEK
- School district: Kansai
- Educational authority: Ministère de l'Education Nationale
- Director: Boris Colin
- Grades: Preschool to Senior High School
- Campus: Yurin
- Accreditation: AEFE
- Website: www.lfikyoto.org

Lycée Français International de Kyoto (京都国際フランス学園, Kyōto Kokusai Furansu Gakuen) or LFIK (French International School Kyoto) is a private French international school founded and managed by a parents school board (APEK) accredited by the Agency for French Education Abroad (AEFE).

The school is located in the Shimogyo District near Kyoto Station and delivers a teaching in conformity with the education program of the French Ministry of National Education just like any schools in France, while serving levels from Preschool through Senior High School.

The French International School Kyoto is an institution recognised by the French Ministry of National Education.

In 2017, the LFK was renamed to LFIK, French International School Kyoto, with 170 students.

== History ==
Initially known as École Française du Kansai or EFK (関西フランス学院) Kansai Furansu Gakuin.

Later the name changed to Lycée Français de Kyoto (French School of Kyoto), LFK (リセ・フランセ・ド・京都) Rise Furanse do Kyōto.

It was founded in 1996, and formerly resided in the Taiken Elementary School in Kamigyo-ku.

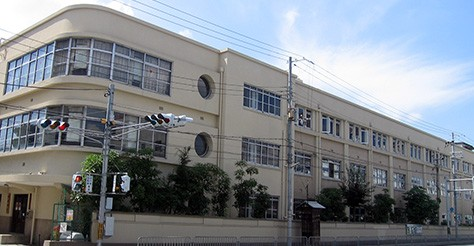
Former Taiken school building

== See also ==
- France-Japan relations
- Institut français du Japon - Kansai (アンスティチュ・フランセ関西)
- Lycée Français International de Tokyo

Japanese international schools in France:

- Institut Culturel Franco-Japonais – École Japonaise de Paris
- Lycée Konan (defunct)
- Lycée Seijo (defunct)
