= Tulio Enrique León =

Venezuelan musician (1938–1982)

Tulio Enrique León (October 11, 1938 ‒ March 18, 1982) was a Venezuelan organist, composer, and arranger. Born in Maracaibo, Venezuela, he would become one of Venezuela's most popular artists and came to be known as El Artista del Teclado (the Artist of the Keyboard).

== Biography ==
Tulio Enrique Leon's parents were Natividad Ordonez del Castillo and Tulio Enrique León Gonzalez.

Tulio Enrique was attracted to music from an early age when he used to create, according to him, turntables, making a cornet from cardboard, on which he put a sewing machine needle, sliding on a record, to get sound.

In 1947, after his eyesight was examined in the United States by Spanish ophthalmologist Ramón Castroviejo, he was diagnosed with blindness due to optic nerve atrophy. The doctor, considering the irreversibility of the disease, recommended that he use the money for the surgery to buy a piano and learn to play. Having done this, Tulio Enrique's confidence was restored and the doors to his musical career were thus opened.

Tulio Enrique's obsession was playing the organ, as he frequently listened to Radio Caracas, where he often heard the Panamanian organist Salvador Muñoz. He decided to sell the piano, acquiring a Hammond organ and devoted himself to its study and practice.

== Musical career ==
In 1961, Tulio Enrique auditioned for and performed on Venevision in Caracas. He debuted in the musical Show de Show (Show of Shows) performing the song "Rio Manzanares." Following his performances in the capital, he appeared on programs including El Show de Renny (The Renny Show), La Feria de la Alegria (The Happiness Fair), and Sábado Sensacional (Sensational Saturday). He was an artist for the Discomoda label. On April 17, 1965, he was ranked number 61 in the Billboard world charts.

=== Hits ===
Tulio Enrique's success traveled the world, he was an idol not only in his native country, but also beyond. In Argentina he contracted with the Odeon label to record several albums. Hits like La Pollera Amarilla (The Yellow Skirt), Ron y Tabaco (Rum and Tobacco), El Cable Submarino (The Submarine Cable), La Pegajosa (The Sticky), Este es el Ritmo (This is the Rhythm) and others, captivated those who listened. Audiences in the Americas, Asia and Europe enjoyed the songs performed by León during his musical career in his short lifetime.

=== Legacy ===
Tulio Enrique León's music has had significant influence in the cumbia genre. His records and songs are popular with DJs who specialize in tropical music. The Mexican neo-cumbia band Sonido Gallo Negro has covered several songs by León.

=== Discography ===
Series	Title	Discography
DCM-269	Este Es El Ritmo	Discomoda
DCM-285	Su Nuevo Estilo Al Organo	Discomoda
DCM-307	El Organo Esta de Moda	Discomoda
DCM-359	El Dengue	Discomoda
DCM-386	Mas Ritmo!	Discomoda
DCM-438	El Artista del Teclado	Discomoda
DCM-468	Tulio Internacional	Discomoda
DCM-493	Dentro del Ritmo	Discomoda
DCM-535	Desde La Argentina	Discomoda
DCM-562	Vacaciones En Venezuela	Discomoda
DCM-576	Ritmo Sabroso	Discomoda
DCM-608	Mas Ritmo Sabroso	Discomoda
DCM-627	Gozando Con Tulio	Discomoda
DCM-654	Rica Cumbia	Discomoda
DCM-661	Vacaciones En Venezuela Vol. II	Discomoda
DCM-694	Con Tulio Es Mejor La Cumbia	Discomoda
DCM-701	Vacaciones En Venezuela Vol. III	Discomoda
DCM-712	Solamente Esto!	Discomoda
DCM-739	Viajando Con Tulio	Discomoda
DCM-758	Los Hits Del Momento	Discomoda
DCM-790	Los Hits Del Momento Vol. II	Discomoda
DCM-800	Saaa...brosisimo	Discomoda
DCM-829	Exitos y Mas Exitos	Discomoda
DCM-866	El Nuevo Tulio Enrique	Discomoda
DCM-904	El Nuevo Tulio Enrique Vol. II	Discomoda
DCM-	Vacaciones En Venezuela Vol. IV	Discomoda
DCM-957	El Nuevo Tulio Enrique Vol. III	Discomoda
DCM-977	Vacaciones En Venezuela Vol. V	Discomoda
DCM-	A Millon	Discomoda
DCM-1112	Vacaciones En Venezuela Vol. VI	Discomoda
DCM-1136	En La Onda	Discomoda
