= Juanita Banana (song) =

Single by The Peels
- B-side: "Fun"
- Released: 1966
- Recorded: 1966
- Label: Karate 522; Stateside 513 (UK)
- Songwriter(s): Tash Howard; Murray Kenton
- Producer(s): "A (Tash) Howard/Smith Production"

"Juanita Banana" is a novelty song adaptation from Mexican folk music by Tash Howard and Murray Kenton. The song, which tells the story of a Mexican banana farmer's daughter with operatic ambitions and whose chorus is an adaptation of "Caro Nome" from Giuseppe Verdi's opera Rigoletto, was originally released in the United States in 1966.

== The Peels ==
The original release of "Juanita Banana" was performed by The Peels, a studio group assembled by co-writer Tash Howard, who also co-produced the single. The Peels consisted of Gail Allan (22), Bill Spilka (25), Harvey Davis (23), and Harold Swart. Howard also wrote "Juanita Banana Part 2" for The Peels as a follow-up release later in the same year.

The record by The Peels charted on the Billboard Hot 100 peaking at #59 in 1966.

The Verdi-inspired chorus of the Peels recording was sampled later that year in the Dickie Goodman record "Batman & His Grandmother".

== Other versions ==
Henri Salvador, Luis Aguilé, Los Tres Sudamericanos, Paola Neri, Het Cocktail Trio, Los Yaki, Quartetto Cetra and Bukasový Masív were among the many artists who recorded non-English cover versions of the song.

The song was also covered by Freddie & The Dreamers on their 1967 album ‘King Freddie & His Dreaming Knights’.
