= Montigny-le-Bretonneux =

- Commune
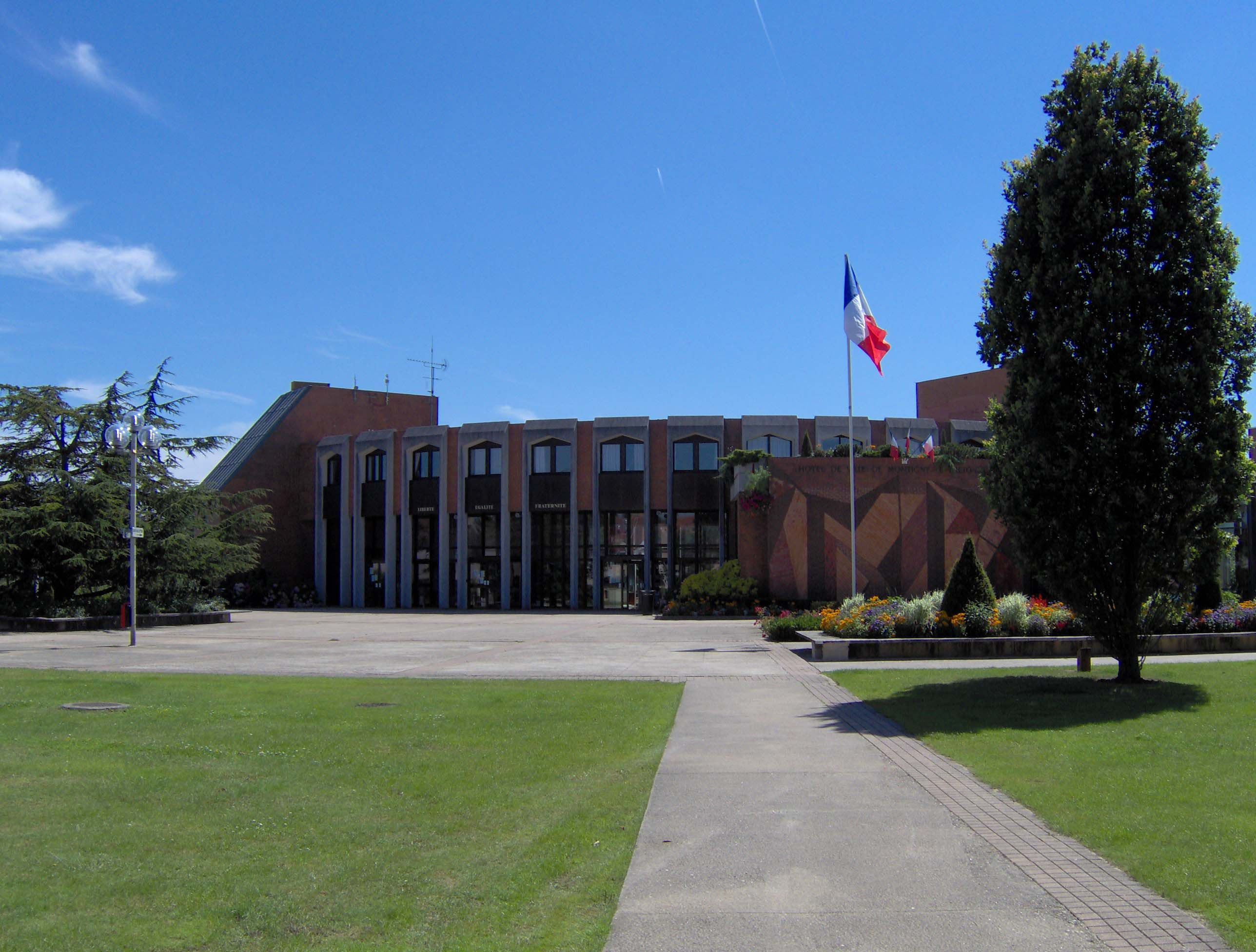
- The Hôtel de Ville

- Coat of arms

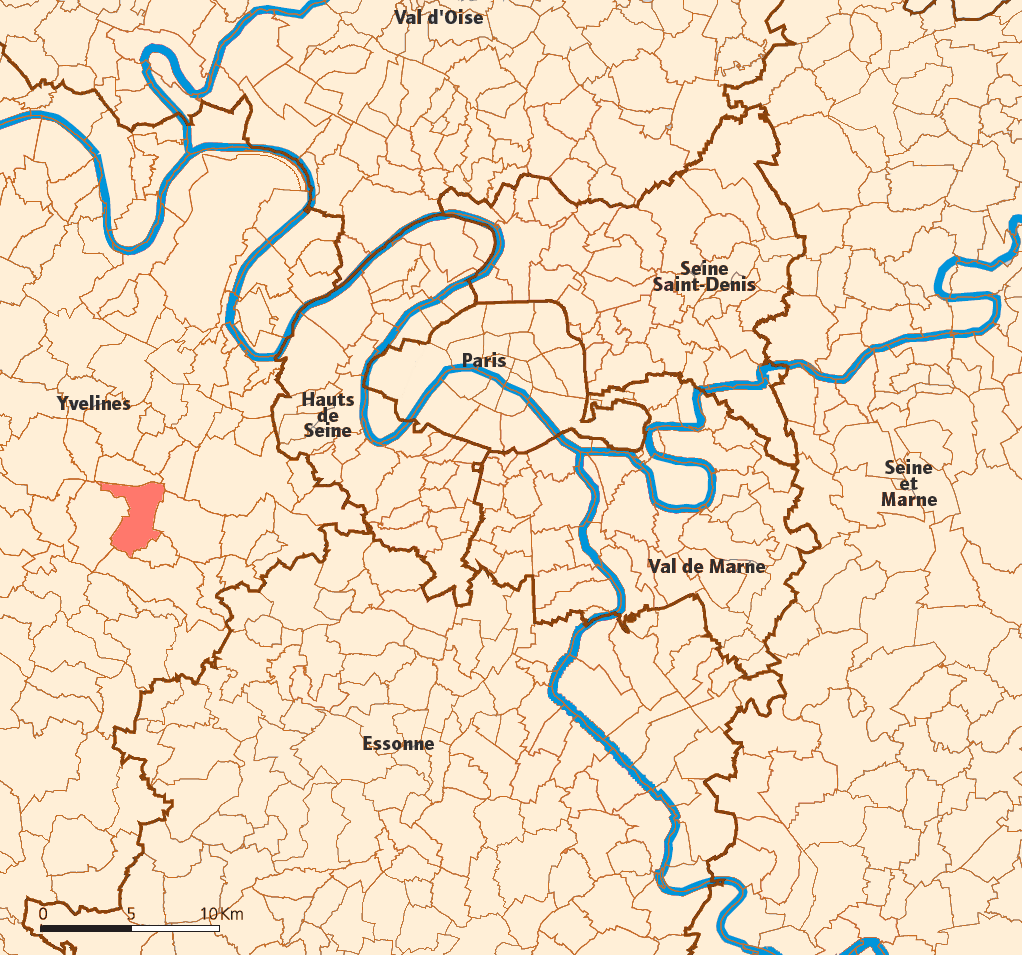
- Location (in red) within Paris inner and outer suburbs
- Location of Montigny-le-Bretonneux
- Location within France Location within Île-de-France (region)
- Coordinates: 48°46′16″N 2°02′00″E
- Country: France
- Region: Île-de-France
- Department: Yvelines
- Arrondissement: Versailles
- Canton: Montigny-le-Bretonneux
- Intercommunality: Saint-Quentin-en-Yvelines

Government
  - Mayor (2020–2026): Lorrain Merckaert
- Area^{1}: 11.65 km^{2} (4.50 sq mi)
- Highest elevation: 171 m (561 ft)
- Lowest elevation: 150 m (490 ft)
- Population (2023): 32,465
  - Density: 2,787/km^{2} (7,218/sq mi)
- Time zone: UTC+01:00 (CET)
  - Summer (DST): UTC+02:00 (CEST)
- INSEE/Postal code: 78423 /78180
- ^{1} French Land Register data, which excludes lakes, ponds, glaciers > 1 km^{2} (0.386 sq mi or 247 acres) and river estuaries.

Montigny-le-Bretonneux (French pronunciation: [mɔ̃tiɲi lə bʁətɔnø]) is a commune in the Yvelines department in the Île-de-France region in north-central France. It is located in the south-western suburbs of Paris, 24.5 kilometres (15.2 miles) from the centre of Paris, in the "new town" of Saint-Quentin-en-Yvelines, of which it is the central and most populated commune.

== History ==
Montigny-le-Bretonneux, the 8th town of the Yvelines department by population, has 33,000 inhabitants and is the central and principal town of the Saint-Quentin-en-Yvelines district. It is situated at the heart of Yvelines, between the Vallée de Chevreuse and the Forest of Rambouillet in the south, and the towns of Versailles and Saint-Germain-en-Laye in the north.

The history of the town reflects that of a small traditional French village, devoted to agriculture. The growth of the new town in the 1970s actually initiates the change from the village of Montigny-le-Bretonneux (1292 inhabitants in 1970) to the town (10,063 in 1980). The Hôtel de Ville was completed in 1987.

The town is found 25 km (16 miles) south west of Paris, and 5 km (3 miles) from Versailles, and at the heart of an agglomeration of 150,000 people, of which Montigny is the largest commune.

After two decades of steady urbanization, Montigny-le-Bretonneux is now essentially completed, although the opportunity to create new housing is still there. In 2002, the State has decreed the end of the Operation of National Interest Statute establishing the new district of Saint-Quentin-en-Yvelines, whose seven member municipalities have opted for a new intercommunal principal, the “Community of Agglomeration”.

Montigny-le-Bretonneux has now passed the building phase — the frenzy of building that characterised the town is suitably balanced between neighbourhoods and business areas. Montigny has become a haven for St. Quentinois wishing to settle there.

The parks were born in the 1970s and 1980s with the rise of the new town are and were in principle built to rehabilitate the economic heritage and to adapt to technological standards now imposed on businesses. Its economy is rooted primarily in the service sector (1,590 businesses). Furthermore, several major headquarters of international companies have settled in the city (for example; SAIPEM, BMW France et COGEMA).

Recent developments in Montigny-le-Bretonneux include the national velodrome built between 2011 and 2014, supported by the State, the French Cycling Federation, local authorities and a pool of business partners, and the Faculty of Medicine (UFR des sciences de la santé Simone Veil), part of the Versailles Saint-Quentin-en-Yvelines University.

== Population ==
Historical population

Year	Pop.	±% p.a.
1793	265	—
1821	266	+0.01%
1846	308	+0.59%
1872	338	+0.36%
1901	339	+0.01%
1926	375	+0.40%
1946	501	+1.46%
1962	543	+0.50%
1968	937	+9.52%

Year	Pop.	±% p.a.
1975	1,550	+7.46%
1982	14,093	+37.07%
1990	31,687	+10.66%
1999	35,216	+1.18%
2007	34,038	−0.42%
2012	33,680	−0.21%
2017	32,929	−0.45%
2023	32,465	−0.24%

Source: EHESS and INSEE (1968-2023)

== Events ==
The town organises annual events for which the community comes together to celebrate. Some are listed below:

- Le Vide-greniers; literally Empty Lofts ! This important occasion happens in spring on the avenue Nicolas About:
- La Journée de l’Europe : organised in May, this day celebrates all European values. All the schools, universities, businesses, homes and societies join to celebrate the diversity with song, food and dancing.
- La Cavalcade – this is a huge event in the Montigny calendar in all quarters of the town. The municipal services and varying associations of Montigny come together for La cavalcade, perhaps known in Britain as the Montigny Carnival. Each carnival is based on a theme and is held every two years. The day is divided into three main events; the morning sees the town’s neighbourhoods come alive whilst the actual parade itself takes place in the afternoons. The evening sees spectacular performances at the Ferme de Manet.
- La Vesprée takes places every other year when the Carnival does not. Similar to a large garden party, these soirées take place honouring educational and recreational aspects.
- The Fire of Saint John is organized the same year as the vespers. At dusk, this evening celebrates the summer solstice. Everyone is invited to light the bonfire, whose flames are a celebration of light, and dance to the rhythm of a popular dance.
- Day Auto-Moto Retro: this event organised by Montigny le Bretonneux and the Association of Old Pistons is normally held in early September. It is a parade of vintage vehicles whose owners are proud to present and discuss their "little miracles". These demonstrations are followed by a competition of elegance!
- Marché de Noël : For three days the Ferme du Manet installs a fantasy village in a magical setting of trees and light. A winter wonderland of gifts and crafts is put on within the village.
- Paris-Brest-Paris : A 1,200 km bicycle ride that takes place every 4 years, in late summer.

== Transport ==
Montigny-le-Bretonneux is served by Saint-Quentin-en-Yvelines–Montigny-le-Bretonneux station on Paris RER line C, on the Transilien La Défense suburban rail line, and on the Transilien Paris-Montparnasse line N suburban rail line.

== Neighbourhoods ==
The community has nine neighbourhoods. They are Manet, Pas du Lac, Plan de l'Eglise, Plan de Troux Prés, Saint Quentin, Sourderie Nord, Sourderie Sud, and Village.

== Education ==
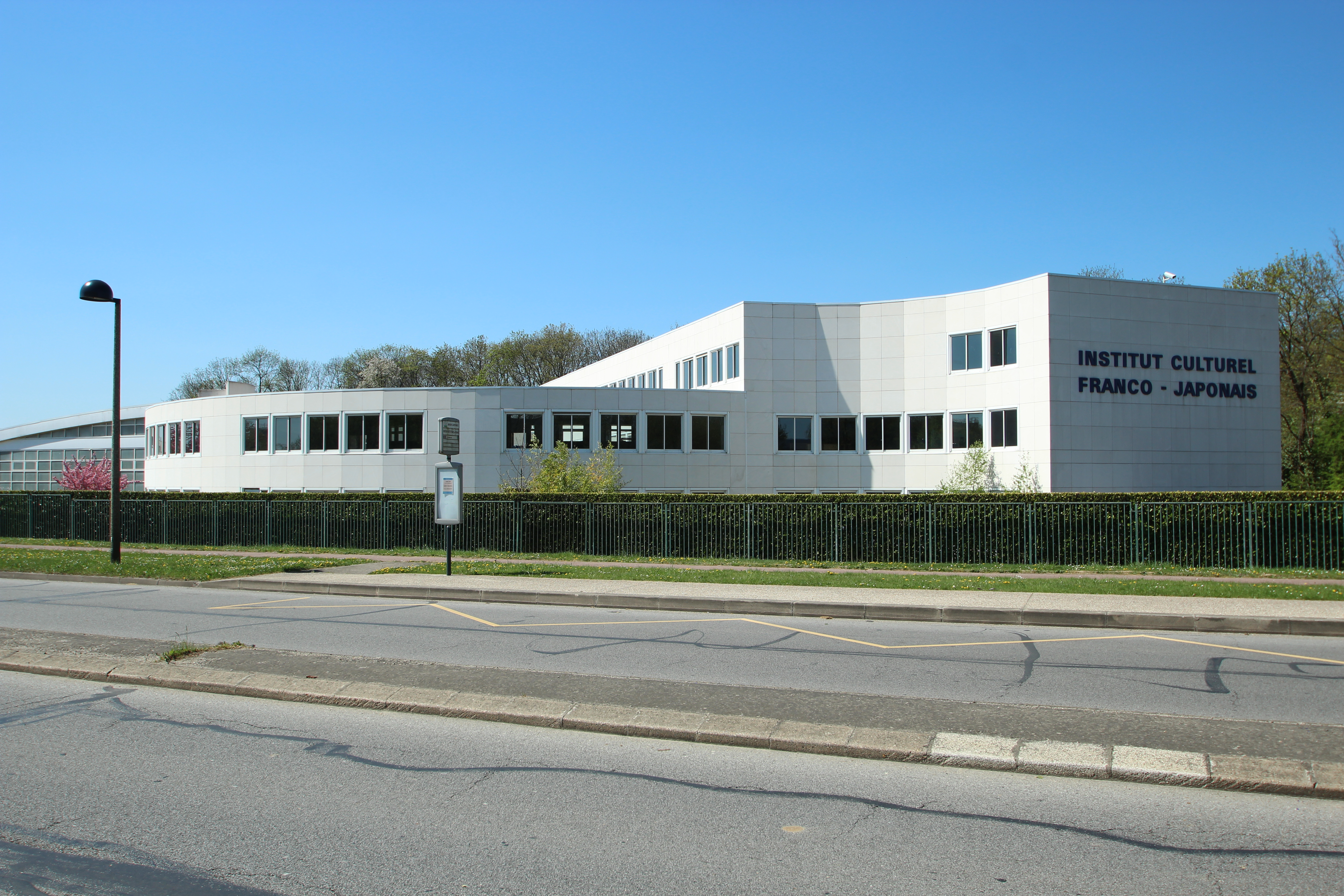
Institut Culturel Franco-Japonais – École Japonaise de Paris

15 schools serve école maternelle (preschool) students, and 15 schools serve école élémentaire (elementary) students. There are two groupes scolaires, or combined preschools and elementary schools.

Public secondary schools:

- Junior high schools: Collège Alberto Giacometti, Collège de La Couldre, Collège Les Prés.
- Lycée Descartes de Montigny le Bretonneux is located in the city.

Private schools:

- Collège Lycées Saint François d'Assise
- Institut de formation de Saint-Quentin-en-Yvelines
- The Institut culturel franco-japonais, a Japanese international school (elementary and junior high school), is in the commune.

== Town logo ==
The rainbow symbolises the radiance and vitality of the town. The dominant green colour symbolises the green space of the community, and the Ferme du Manet and leisure facilities in the town. The four white stones and lily are the historical reference; under l’ancien Regime, important boundaries marking royal properties were marked with a white stone, engraved with initials or a crest. At Montigny, the crest was a lily flower. Four were planted at a crossroads leading to Versailles, Trappes, Montigny and Bois d’Arcy.

== Twin towns – sister cities ==
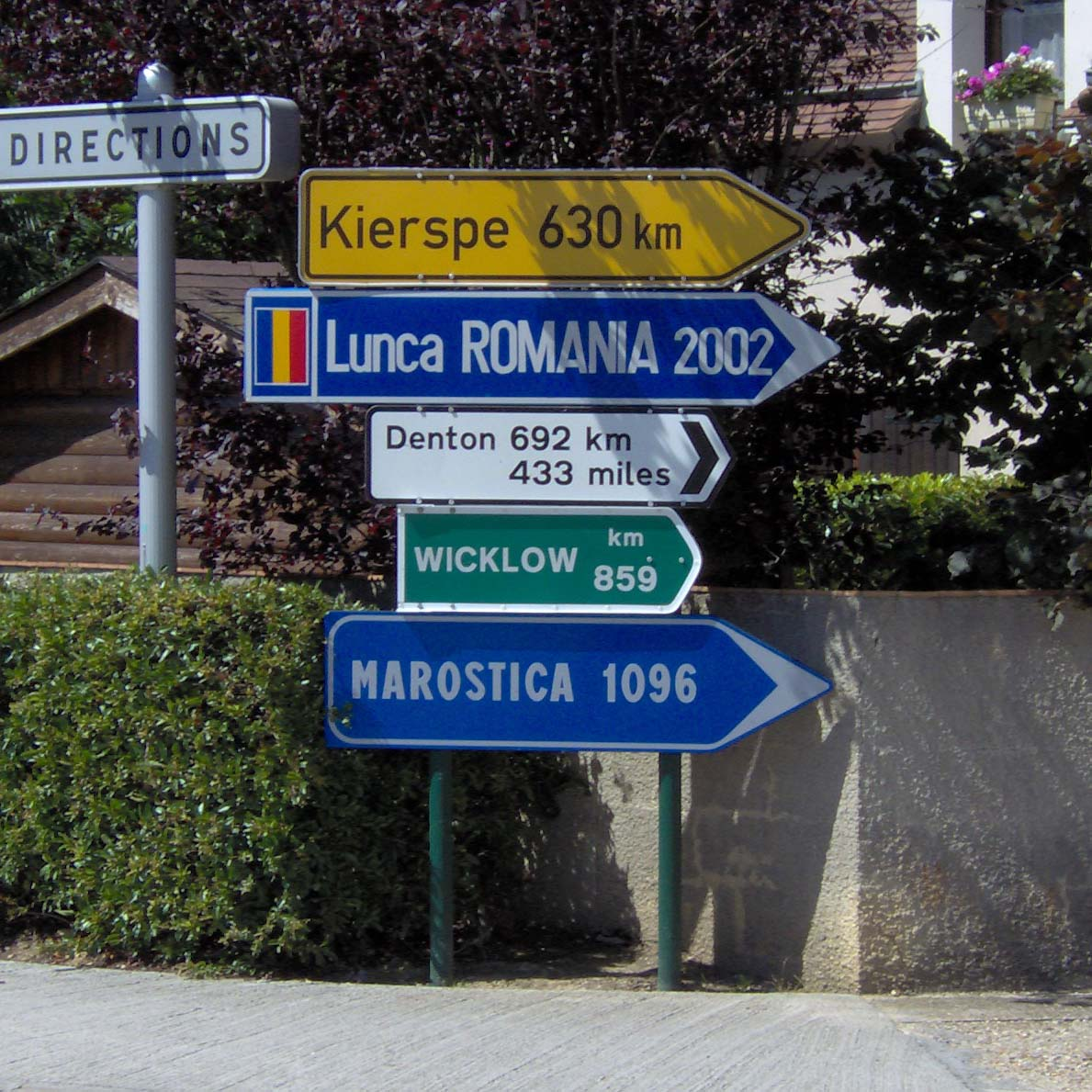
Signpost with Montigny-le-Bretonneux's twin towns in 2007

Montigny-le-Bretonneux is twinned with:

- Denton, United Kingdom
- Dolyna, Ukraine
- Kierspe, Germany
- Lunca, Romania
- Marostica, Italy
- San Fernando, Spain
- (Republic of Ireland) Wicklow, Ireland

Curiously, the signpost pictured on the right implies that all the twin towns, be they in Germany, Romania, the United Kingdom, Ireland, Spain or Italy, are in the same direction from Montigny. Furthermore, the signage is that of what is found in the countries the twin towns are located in.

== See also ==
- Communes of the Yvelines department
