= The Japanese and Europe =

1996 book by Marie Conte-Helm

The Japanese and Europe: Economic and Cultural Encounters
- Title page for The Japanese and Europe: Economic and Cultural Encounters (1996)
- Author: Marie Conte-Helm
- Language: English
- Publisher: Athlone Press
- Publication date: 1996

The Japanese and Europe: Economic and Cultural Encounters is a 1996 book by Marie Conte-Helm, published by Athlone Press. The book discusses Japanese investment and settlement in Europe, which began in the 1980s. Conte-Helm was a reader of Japanese studies at the University of Northumbria. The book's intended audience included both Japanese and Western persons.

The first two chapters discuss the history of Europe-Japan encounters. The first chapter discusses overall history that began in the 1540s, when the Portuguese encountered the Japanese, while the second chapter discusses Japan-European Community relations. The next two chapters discuss the Japanese expatriate communities that formed in Europe. There are separate sections per European country, with one section each discussing the Japanese in Belgium, France, Germany, the Netherlands, Spain, and the United Kingdom. The last chapter, titled "Japanization of Europe: Raw Fish, Wrestling, and 'Just-in-Time'," discusses the effects of Japanese expatriates on European society. Mairi MacLean of Royal Holloway, University of London wrote that the book included "something of a 'survival guide'" for Japanese persons by describing facilities in Europe catering to Japanese.

Several Japanese employees in Europe gave interviews that were used in the making of the book. There are 28 pages of photographs and illustrations, including advertisements, charts, maps, and newspaper articles. Ian Nish, who wrote a book review for Asian Affairs, praised them, saying they were "well-chosen".

== Reception ==
Nish stated that the book was "a pleasure to read".

Raymond Lamont-Brown, who wrote a book review for Contemporary Review, wrote that "Overall the book gives a good grounding in how adjustments of European perspectives about Japan have been and continue to be made."

Sir Hugh Cortazzi, a former Ambassador of the United Kingdom to Japan, wrote in his book review that The Japanese and Europe "is well researched, copiously illustrated and full of interesting information".

MacLean wrote that the book has too much emphasis on the illustrations, which is "[a]t times[...]irritating" and contributes to the "principal flaw" of having "a certain superficiality".
