= Bravo =

Bravo(s) or The Bravo(s) may refer to:

== Arts and entertainment ==
=== Music ===
==== Groups and labels ====
- Bravo (band), a Russian rock band
- Bravo (Spanish group), represented Spain at Eurovision 1984
- Bravo Music, an American concert band music publishing company

==== Albums ====
- Bravo (5566 album) or the title song, 2008
- Bravo (Dr. Sin album), 2007
- Bravo! (EP), by Up10tion, or the title song, 2015
- Bravo!, by Friska Viljor, 2006
- Bravo!, by Tube, 1997

=== Literature ===
- The Bravo, an 1831 novel by James Fenimore Cooper
- Bravo (magazine), a European German-language teen magazine
- Bravo (Romanian magazine), a teen magazine

=== Television shows ===
- Bravo! (TV series), a 1975–1976 Brazilian telenovela
- Bravo TV (TV series), a 1985–1986 German programme

=== Television channels and radio stations ===
- Bravo TV (Argentina), a defunct Argentine television channel
- Bravo! (Croatian radio station), Croatian radio station
- Bravo (American TV network), a cable television network
- Bravo (British TV channel), a digital television channel 1985–2011
- Bravo (Canadian TV network), a cable television network
- Bravo (New Zealand TV channel), a free-to-air channel
- 7Bravo, an Australian free-to-air channel

=== Other arts and entertainment ===
- The Bravo (Titian), a 1516–1517 painting by Titian
- The Bravos, a 1972 American television film
- Captain Bravo, a character in the manga and anime Buso Renkin
- Bravo!, the Theatre on Ice skating teams of Essex Skating Club
- Bravo Award, an annual football award presented by the Italian magazine Guerin Sportivo
- ALMA Award, originally Bravo Awards, the American Latino Media Arts Award

== Brands and companies ==
- Bravo (application), software design to track number of players at a poker room in casinos
- Bravo (editor), the first WYSIWYG word processor, developed at Xerox PARC
- Bravo (Saudi Arabia), a digital radio trunking operator
- Bravo (supermarket), an American grocery store chain
- Chlorothalonil, sold under the brand name Bravo, a fungicide
- Bravo Group, an American lobbying firm headed by Chris Bravacos
- Bravo! Cucina Italian, an American restaurant chain operated by FoodFirst Global Restaurants
- Bravo Transport, a Hong Kong public transport company and owners of operators Citybus and New World First Bus

== Military ==
- Bravo (armed retainer), a coarse soldier or hired assassin employed by Italian rural lords in northern Italy in the 16th and 17th centuries
  - Bravo, code word for the letter B in the NATO phonetic alphabet, the ICAO phonetic alphabet and similar spelling alphabets
  - Bravo, Bravo, Bravo, a vessel emergency code
- Castle Bravo, code name of the first U.S. test of a "dry" thermonuclear device
- Operation Bravo, a military operation during the Vietnam War

== Places ==
- Río Bravo, or Rio Grande, a river that flows through Mexico and the United States
- Bravo Territory, former subdivision of Mexico
- Bravo, Cuba, a community in the municipality of Santiago de Cuba

== Transport ==
=== Aviation ===
- Bravo Airlines, an airline based in Madrid, Spain
- Bravo Airways, an airline based in Kyiv, Ukraine
- Cessna Citation Bravo, a business jet
- FFA AS 202 Bravo, a civil light aircraft
- Mooney Bravo, an aircraft produced by the Mooney Aircraft Company

=== Other transport ===
- HMS Bravo, several ships
- Bravo-class submarine, a design of military submarines built in the then-Soviet Union
- Fiat Bravo, a small family car produced from 1995 to 2001
- Fiat Bravo (2007), a small family car produced from 2007 to 2014
- Hobie Bravo, an American catamaran design
- Lamborghini Bravo, a concept sports car

== Other uses ==
- Bravo (armed retainer) (plural bravi), a type of hired guard or soldier in 16th- and 17th-century Italy
- Bravo (surname), a list of notable people with the name
- BRAVO Volunteer Ambulance, a free volunteer ambulance service in New York City
- NK Bravo, a Slovenian football club
