= Bravo (surname) =

Bravo is a surname. Notable people with the surname include:

- Alfredo Bravo (1925–2003), Argentine activist and politician
- Ángel Bravo (born 1942), Venezuelan baseball player
- Anna Bravo (1938–2019), Italian historian
- Arturo Bravo (1958–2023), Mexican racewalker
- Carme Bravo (1919–2007), Catalan pianist
- Charles Bravo (1845–1876), British lawyer and poisoning victim
- Ciara Bravo (born 1997), American actress
- Claudio Bravo (1936-2011), Chilean artist
- Claudio Bravo (born 1983), Chilean footballer
- Claudio Bravo, (born 1997), Argentinean footballer
- Daniel Bravo (born 1963), French international footballer
- Danny Bravo (born 1948), Indian-American child actor
- Darren Bravo (born 1989), West Indian cricketer
- Dino Bravo (1948–1993), professional wrestler
- Dwayne Bravo (born 1983), West Indian cricketer
- Elisa Bravo, shipwrecked in 1849 in Chile and rumoured captive
- Émile Bravo (born 1964), French comics author
- Fabiana Bravo (born 1969), Argentine soprano
- Felisa Martín Bravo (1898–1979), Spanish physicist
- Flavio Bravo, American politician
- Florence Bravo (1845–1878), wife of Charles Bravo
- Gabriela Bravo (born 1963), Spanish politician
- Guillermina Bravo (1920–2013), Mexican ballet dancer, choreographer and ballet director
- Helia Bravo Hollis (1901–2001), Mexican botanist
- Iván Bravo (born 2001), Spanish footballer
- Jaime Bravo (born 1982), Chilean footballer
- Janicza Bravo (born 1981), American director, producer, and screenwriter
- José María Bravo (1917–2009), Spanish Republican fighter pilot
- Leonardo Bravo (1764–1812), Mexican insurgent
- Leopoldo Bravo (1919–2006), Argentine politician
- Lucas Bravo (born 1988), French actor
- Luis Bravo (disambiguation), several people
- Manuel Bravo (1897–1974), Chilean footballer
- Marcelo Bravo (born 1985), Argentine footballer
- Mario Bravo (1882–1944), Argentine politician and writer
- Martín Bravo (born 1986), Argentine footballer
- Nicolás Bravo (1786–1854), Mexican politician
- Nino Bravo (1944–1973), Spanish singer
- Omar Bravo (born 1980), Mexican footballer
- Orlando Bravo (born 1970), Puerto Rican billionaire businessman
- Raúl Bravo (born 1981), Spanish footballer
- Rose Marie Bravo (born 1951), American businesswoman
- Silvia Bravo (1945–2000), Mexican astronomer

== See also ==
- Bravo (disambiguation)
