= Brooklyn Community Board 10 =

Community district in New York, United States

Brooklyn Community District 10
- Community District
- Country: United States
- State: New York
- City: New York City
- Borough: Brooklyn
- Neighborhoods: List: Bay Ridge; Dyker Heights

Government
  - Chairperson: Sandy Vallas
  - District Manager: Josephine Beckmann

Area
  - Total: 4.0 sq mi (10 km^{2})

Population (2010)
  - Total: 124,491
  - Density: 31,000/sq mi (12,000/km^{2})

Ethnicity
  - African-American: 1.7%
  - Asian: 24.5%
  - Hispanic and Latino Americans: 15.9%
  - White: 55.9%
  - Others: 1.8%
- Time zone: UTC−5 (Eastern)
  - Summer (DST): UTC−4 (EDT)
- ZIP codes: 11209, 11220 and 11228
- Area code: 718, 347, 929, and 917
- Police Precincts: 68th (website)
- Website: www1.nyc.gov/site/brooklyncb10/index.page

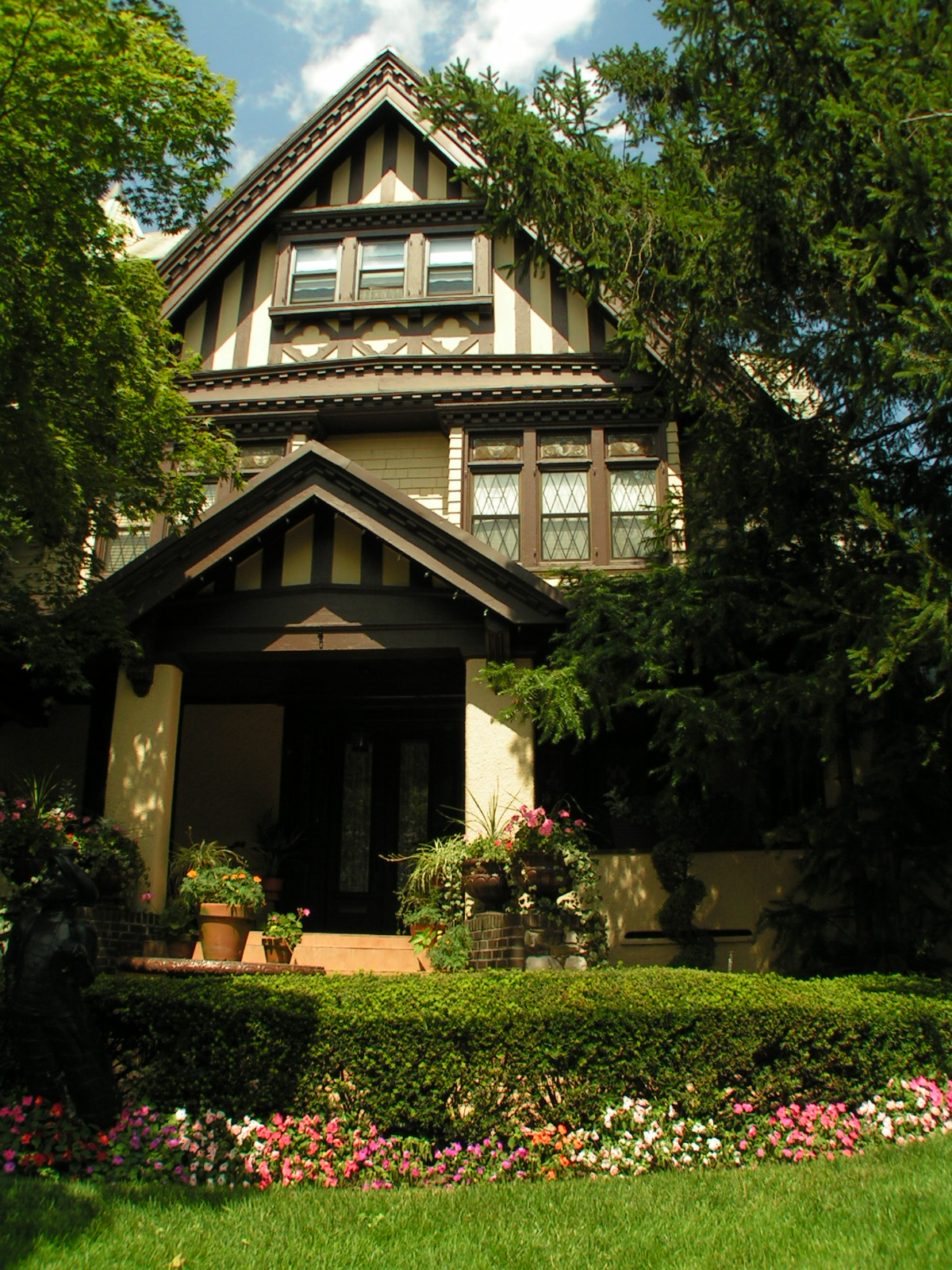
The Saitta House, Dyker Heights, was built in 1899 and is within Community Board 10.

Brooklyn Community Board 10 is a New York City community board that encompasses the Brooklyn neighborhoods of Bay Ridge, Dyker Heights, and Fort Hamilton. It is delimited by Upper New York Bay on the west, Bay Ridge R.R. Yards and Long Island Rail Road on the north, 14th Avenue and Bay 8th Street on the east, as well as by Lower New York Bay on the south.

Its current chairman (2026) is Sandy Vallas, district manager Josephine Beckmann and Dorothy Garuccio as community coordinator

As of the United States Census, 2000, the Community Board has a population of 122,542, up from 110,612 in 1990 and 118,188 in 1980.

Of them (as of 2000), 84,120 (68.6%) are White non Hispanic, 1,402 (1.1%) are African-American, 17,546 (14.3%) Asian or Pacific Islander, 115 (0.1%) American Indian or Native Alaskan, 352 (0.3%) of some other race, 5,611 (4.6%) of two or more race, 13,396 (10.9%) of Hispanic origins.

22.7% of the population benefit from public assistance as of 2004, up from 10.9% in 2000.

The land area is 2,609.5 acres (10.560 km^{2}).
