= Luis Bravo =

Luis Bravo may refer to:

- Luis Bravo (musician), Argentinian musician, see List of number-one hits of 1966 (Argentina)
- Luis Bravo de Acuña (died 1634) Spaniard soldier
- Luis Felipe Bravo Mena (born 1952) Mexican politician
- Luis Armando Melgar Bravo (born 1966) Mexican politician
- Luis González-Bravo y López de Arjona (1811–1871) Spaniard politician

== See also ==
- Bravo (surname)
- Nino Bravo (1944–1973, born Luis Manuel Ferri Llopis), Spaniard singer
- Bravo (disambiguation)
- Luis (disambiguation)
