= 2028 United States Senate election in Pennsylvania =

- November 7, 2028
Party	Democratic	Republican
Incumbent U.S. senator
John Fetterman
Democratic

The 2028 United States Senate election in Pennsylvania will be held on November 7, 2028, to elect a member of the United States Senate to represent the state of Pennsylvania. Incumbent John Fetterman has filed paperwork to run for re-election to a second term, although he is publicly undecided on whether to seek a second term or not.

== Background ==
Pennsylvania, a swing state, is seen as a critical Senate race for Republicans to win back the Senate in 2028. Pennsylvania has voted within 2% in the last 3 presidential elections, including supporting Republican Donald Trump twice. Additionally, in a major upset, Republican Dave McCormick unseated three-term incumbent Bob Casey Jr. in the 2024 United States Senate election in Pennsylvania. However, in 2026, Democrats won their first trifecta in 33 years by flipping the state senate, along with maintaining their majority in the Pennsylvania House of Representatives and holding the governorship. Additionally, Pennsylvania Democrats control 11 of 17 house seats in the state.

== Democratic primary ==
=== Background ===
Senator John Fetterman is seen as a likely target for a primary challenge should he run for re-election. In addition to voting to confirm several members of the second Trump cabinet, Fetterman has emerged as a strong supporter of Israel in the Gaza war and of Donald Trump's attacks on Iran. Opinion polling from Quinnipiac University in February 2026 found only 22% of Democratic voters approved of Fetterman; a New York Times/Philadelphia Inquirer/Siena poll from August 2026 also found Fetterman at 22% approval among registered Democrats.

The Pennsylvania Working Families Party announced they would support a primary challenger to Fetterman in 2028.

=== Candidates ===
==== Declared ====
- Ahmed Moor, journalist

==== Filed paperwork ====
- John Fetterman, incumbent U.S. senator (2023–present)

==== Publicly expressed interest ====
- Madeleine Dean, U.S. representative from PA-04 (2019–present) and former state representative from the 153rd district (2012–2018)
- Chris Deluzio, U.S. representative from PA-17 (2023–present)

==== Potential ====
- Maria Collett, state senator from the 12th district (2019–present)
- Austin Davis, lieutenant governor of Pennsylvania (2023–present)
- Malcolm Kenyatta, state representative from the 181st district (2019–present), vice chair of the Democratic National Committee (2025–present) and candidate for U.S. Senate in 2022
- Conor Lamb, former U.S. representative from PA-17 (2018-2023) and candidate for U.S. Senate in 2022
- Summer Lee, U.S. representative from PA-12 (2023–present)
- Mary Gay Scanlon, U.S. representative from PA-05 (2018–present)
- Susan Wild, former U.S. representative from PA-07 (2018–2025)

==== Declined ====
- Brendan Boyle, U.S. representative from PA-02 (2015–present)
- Bob Casey Jr., former U.S. senator from Pennsylvania (2007–2025)

=== Endorsements ===
Summer Lee (undeclared)

U.S. representatives

- Ilhan Omar, MN-05 (2019–present)
- Ayanna Pressley, MA-07 (2019–present)
- Rashida Tlaib, MI-12 (2019–present)
Declined to endorse

Political parties

- Working Families Party (endorsed against Fetterman)

=== Fundraising ===
Campaign finance reports as of September 30, 2026
Candidate	Raised	Spent	Cash on hand
John Fetterman (D)	$10,403,670	$8,776,622	$2,254,398
Source: Federal Election Commission

== Republican primary ==
=== Candidates ===
==== Potential ====
- John Fetterman, incumbent U.S. senator (2023–present) (Democratic) (Note: While Fetterman is currently a Democrat, Republicans have made efforts to recruit him)
- Brian Fitzpatrick, outgoing U.S. representative from PA-01 (2017–present)
- Jared Isaacman, administrator of NASA (2025–present) and founder of Shift4 (Independent)
- Dan Meuser, U.S. representative from PA-09 (2019–present)
- Dave Sunday, attorney general of Pennsylvania (2025–present)

== General election ==
=== Polling ===
Hypothetical polling

John Fetterman vs. generic opponent

Poll source	Date(s) administered	Sample size (Note: Key: A – all adults RV – registered voters LV – likely voters V – unclear)	Margin of error	John Fetterman	Generic Opponent
Bravo Group	September 16–22, 2026	624 (LV)	± 4.3%	36%	64%
Bravo Group	August 18–22, 2026	711 (LV)	± 4.4%	39%	61%
Bravo Group	July 17–24, 2026	630 (LV)	± 4.4%	40%	60%
