= Thirteenth Avenue (Brooklyn) =

Avenue in Brooklyn, New York

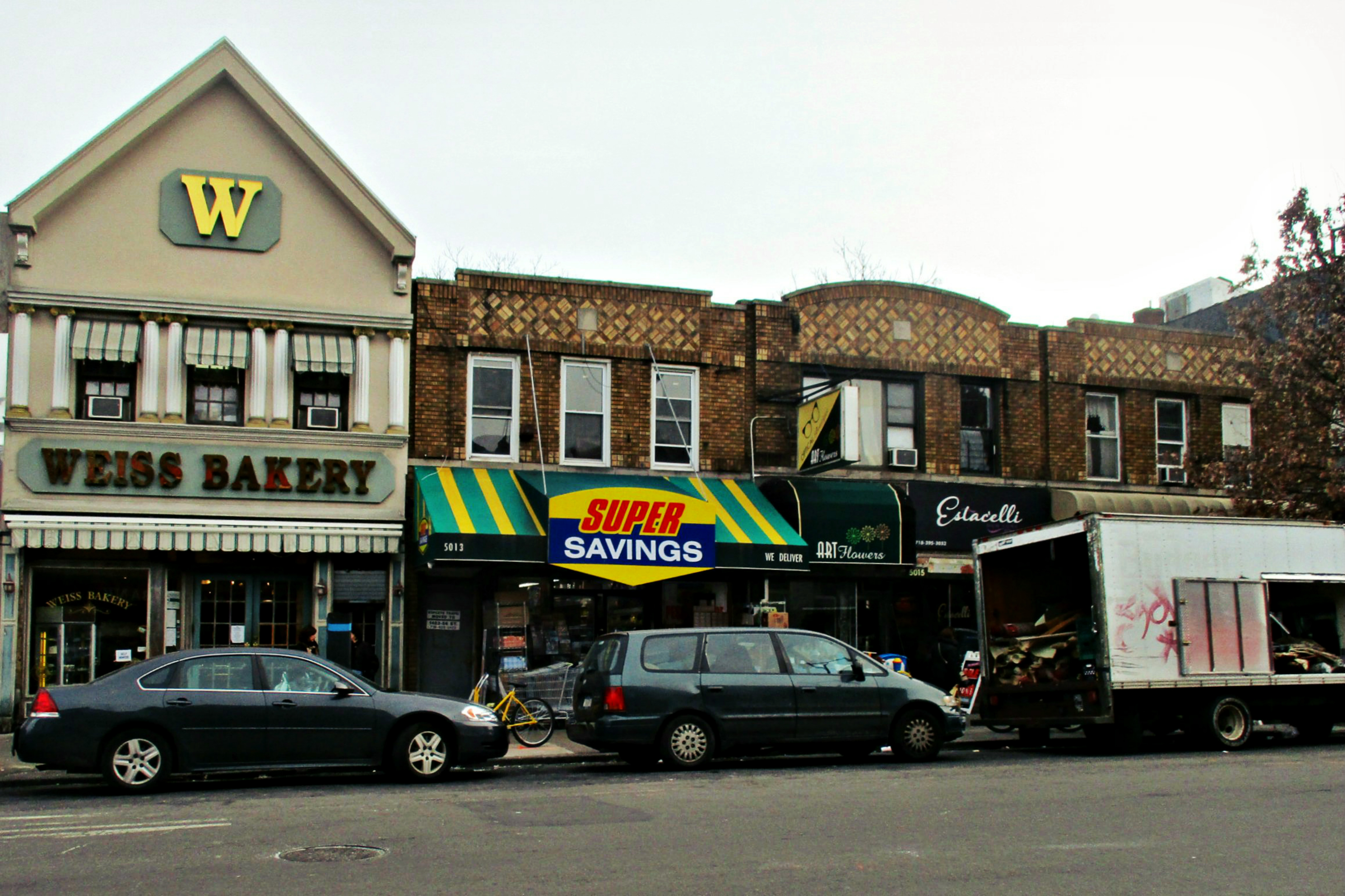
- 13th Avenue near 50th Street
- Interactive map of Thirteenth Avenue
- Owner: City of New York
- Maintained by: NYCDOT
- Length: 2.5 mi (4.0 km)
- Location: Brooklyn, New York City
- South end: 86th Street in Dyker Heights
- Major junctions: NY 27 in South Slope
- North end: 36th Street in Borough Park
- East: Fourteenth Avenue
- West: Twelfth Avenue

Thirteenth Avenue (or 13th Avenue) is a roughly 2.5-mile-long (4.0 km) street in the borough of Brooklyn in New York City. Thirteenth Avenue is the commercial center of the Brooklyn neighborhoods of Borough Park, and Dyker Heights.

13th Avenue starts at 36th Street in Kensington. It maintains a relatively straight route through Borough Park and ends at 86th Street in Dyker Heights. The avenue is 2.5 miles (4.0 km) long. It is part of a one-way pair with Fourteenth Avenue, being one-way southbound to 60th Street (14th Avenue is one-way northbound north of New Utrecht Avenue and 60th Street). While New York neighborhoods have no official boundaries, the two neighborhoods meet approximately in the area of 65th Street.

In an approximately 1 mile (1.6 km) section traversing Borough Park, the street contains a huge variety of stores, businesses and food establishments catering to the local and international Haredi Jewish community.

== Borough Park section ==
The avenue extends roughly 1 mile (1.6 km) in length through Borough Park, and contains a huge variety of stores, businesses and food establishments catering to the local and international Haredi Jewish community. While the sidewalks and streets are heavily congested during the week, all stores and businesses are shuttered on the Jewish Sabbath and Jewish holidays. In December 2012, the stretch of 13th Avenue from 36th to 60th Streets was co-named Raoul Wallenberg Way in honor of the Swedish diplomat who saved 100,000 Hungarian Jews during the Holocaust. Many of these survivors settled in Borough Park after the war and raised their families here.

=== History ===
Jewish immigrants began populating Borough Park at the turn of the 20th century. Through the 1930s, 13th Avenue was lined with pushcart vendors and pickle sellers. In the late 1930s the city opened a public market on 42nd Street to force an end to the pushcart trade. Thirteenth Avenue gentrified into an avenue of specialty shops interspersed with regular merchandise stores, and the avenue itself turned into a place "to see and be seen".

=== Demographics ===
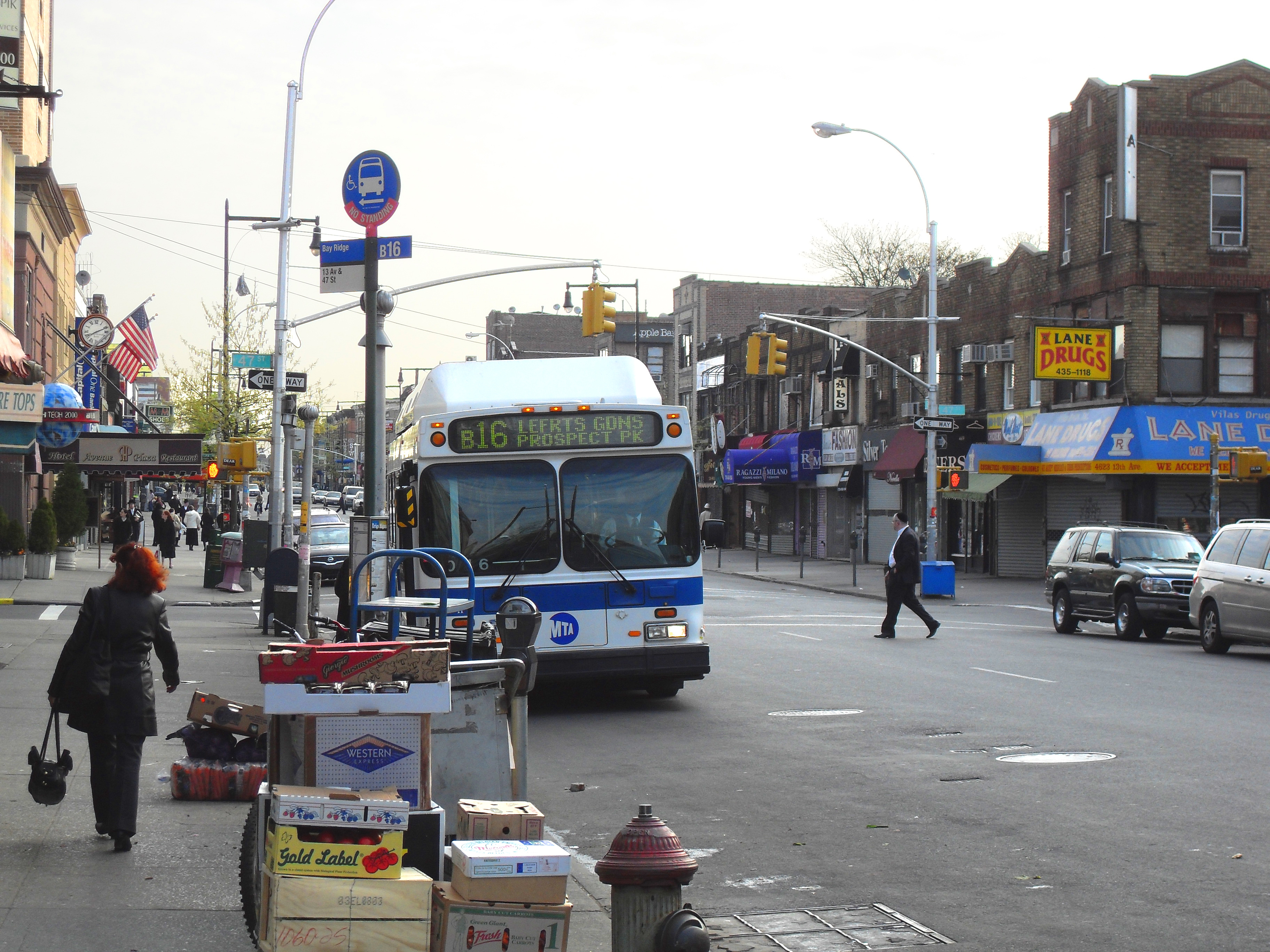
B16 bus on 13th Avenue at 47th Street in Borough Park

In the 1980s the religious Jewish demographic of Borough Park shifted from Modern Orthodox to Hasidic families. In response, new shops and restaurants opened on 13th Avenue to serve the expanding Haredi community. In 1987 two of the most popular stores debuted: Eichler's Judaica bookstore and Kosher Castle Dairy Cafeteria. New stores also opened selling imported goods and computer technology. At the end of the 1990s, businesses began selling electronics and Jewish books, music and videos to overseas customers via the Internet.

=== Growth ===
Observers credit the younger generation of Borough Park, who prefer to do business with other Jews, for fueling 13th Avenue's commercial growth. Most businesses are independently owned. One sign of the strong 13th Avenue economy is the heavy concentration of banks lining the avenue, including two Chase banks standing one block apart, at 48th and 49th streets. In 2009 a ten-block strip of 13th Avenue, from 45th to 55th Streets, had 14 banks, with two more opening by 2010. Flushing Bank and Northfield Bank joined the mix in 2012.

The avenue has achieved global recognition, especially among Israeli expatriates and tourists. In 1987, The Park House Hotel opened its doors between 12th and 13th avenues on 48th Street as the first kosher Hotel in Borough Park. In 1999 a 52-room luxury kosher hotel, the Avenue Plaza Hotel, opened on 13th Avenue, becoming the first hotel to appear in the neighborhood in more than a decade. These hotels along with many area merchants specifically accommodate the needs of visiting Hasidic tourists.

=== Description ===
On most early Friday afternoons Amnon's Kosher Pizza on Thirteenth Avenue in Boro Park is so crowded that most people finish their meals standing up.

— Michael Taub, "My Mother's Borough Park"

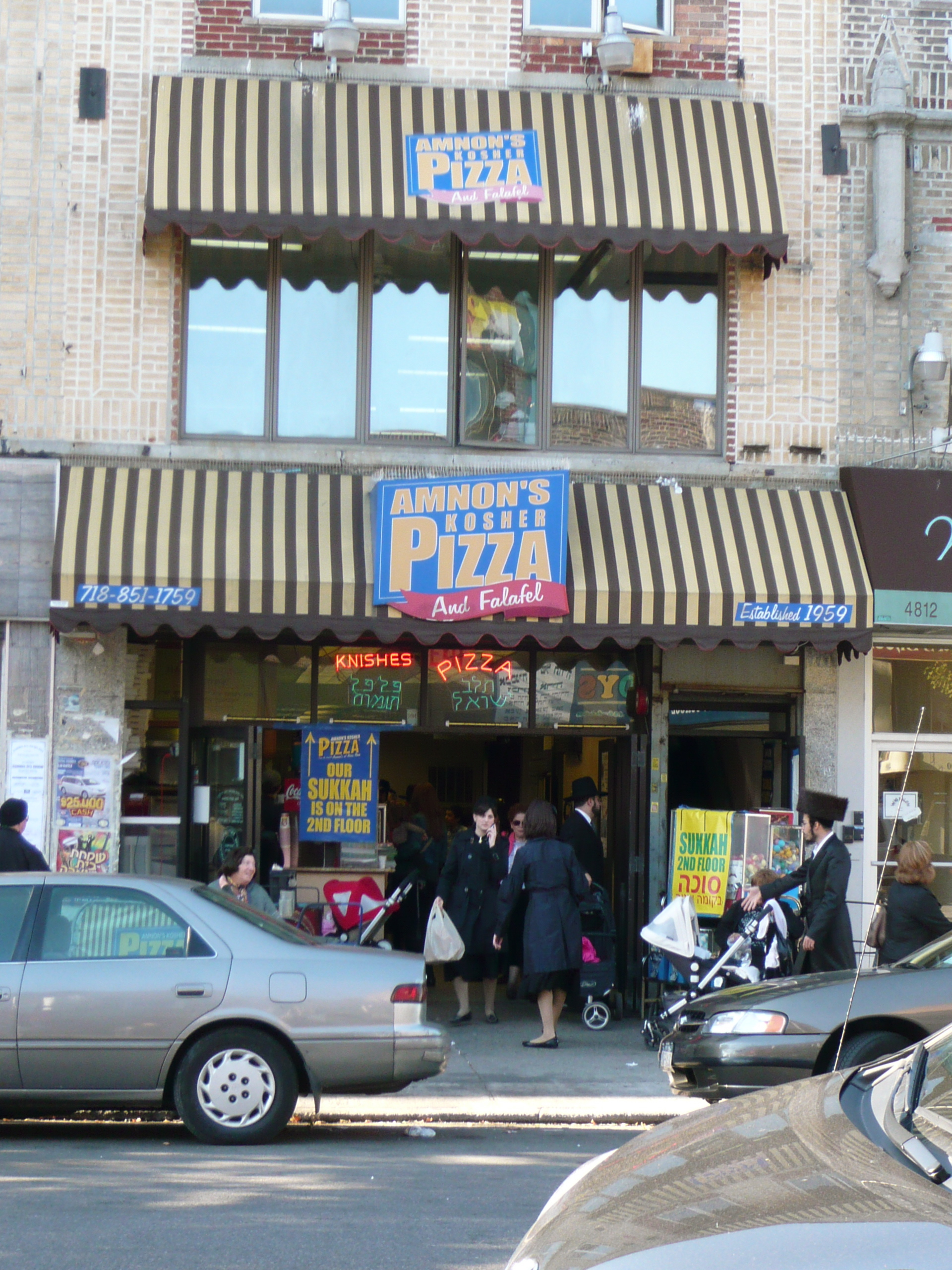
Amnon's Kosher Pizza and Falafel store on Chol HaMoed Sukkot

In Borough Park, 13th Avenue is primarily zoned as either a commercial district, or a residential district with commercial shops on the first floor. A New York Times reporter compared the stretch of 13th Avenue in Borough Park to the Lower East Side at the beginning of the 20th century, where Orthodox Jews could buy anything they needed. The huge selection on 13th Avenue includes religious items, silver Judaica, Jewish books, electronics, modest clothing for men and women, children's clothes, wig stores, kosher meat markets, kosher bakeries, and kosher candy stores. All kinds of ethnic and modern Jewish dining establishments abound, including restaurants, cafes, delis and pizza stores, all with strict rabbinic supervision. Specialty clothing satisfying the different minhagim (customs) of the various Hasidic sects in the neighborhood is readily available. Thirteenth Avenue is known as the "Avenue of Values". In the days preceding major Jewish holidays, 13th Avenue is also filled with sidewalk vendors selling holiday needs.

The sidewalks and street are often congested, and parking is at a premium. Locals and tourists flood the avenue on Sundays and the eves of Jewish holidays. In 1989 the two-way avenue was converted to one-way in an effort to reduce congestion, but the traffic remains heavy. Children and strollers are seen everywhere, as the Haredi Jewish residents with typically large families shop for their needs. Borough Park is considered a low-crime neighborhood, and parents often leave their babies unattended in strollers outside stores and restaurants.

Notwithstanding the weekday hustle and bustle, shops close and cars disappear on the Jewish Sabbath and Jewish holidays. The handful of chain stores, such as Rite Aid, Duane Reade and The Children's Place, also close on the Jewish Sabbath and Jewish holidays. On these days, Hasidim garbed in their holiday finery traverse the avenue to attend morning synagogue services, and couples stroll with their baby carriages in the afternoon.

Since 1999, 13th Avenue has been the site for a nightly Simchat Beit HaShoeivah musical performance during the intermediate days of Sukkot, organized by Chabad Rabbi Aaron Ginsburg.

=== Raoul Wallenberg Way ===
On December 9, 2012, the first day of Hanukkah, the stretch of 13th Avenue between 36th and 60th streets was co-named Raoul Wallenberg Way in honor of the Swedish diplomat who saved 100,000 Hungarian Jews during the Holocaust. Legislation for the renaming was submitted by New York City Councilmen David G. Greenfield and Brad Lander in conjunction with the Raoul Wallenberg Centennial Celebration Commission. Hundreds of people attended the naming ceremony. According to speakers at the event, many of the individuals rescued by Wallenberg immigrated to Borough Park to establish their families. The neighborhood is home to the largest concentration of Holocaust survivors and their descendants in the United States.

== Dyker Heights section ==
In Dyker Heights, 13th Avenue is home to a significant Italian and Italian-American upper middle class to upper class population and is zoned mostly for low-density residential townhouses, with shops on the first floors of some buildings. It is a two-way street with one lane in each direction, and ends at Dyker Beach Park and Golf Course at 86th Street.

== Transportation ==
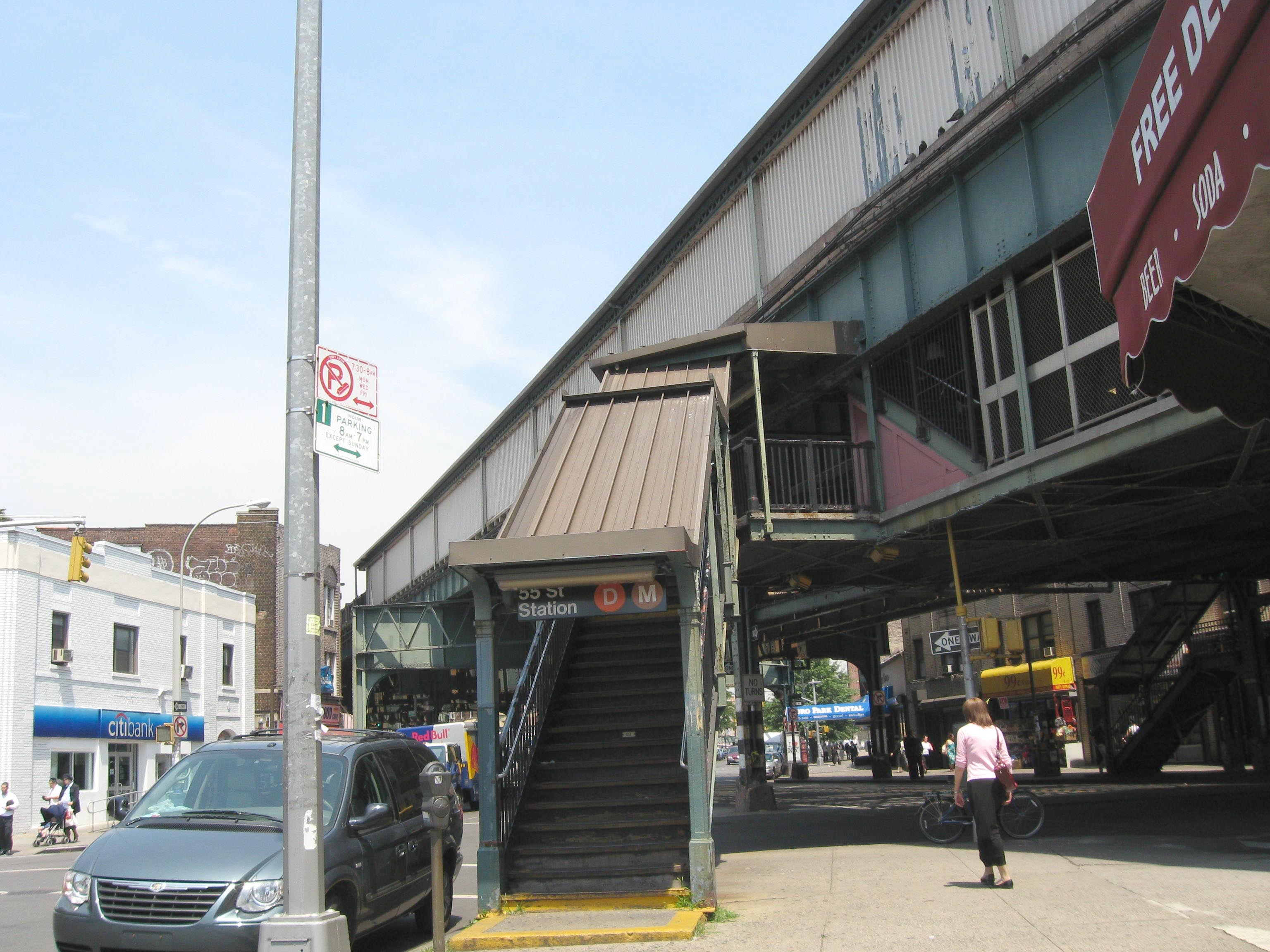
Stair to 55th Street station

13th Avenue is served by the following:

- The B16 route of New York City Bus runs the avenue in the southbound direction from 37th Street to 57th Street. (Northbound buses run on 14th Avenue from 56th to 36th Streets.)
- The B64 bus runs on 13th Avenue in both directions south of Bay Ridge Avenue.
- The Sunset Park-bound B35 runs from 36th to 39th Streets.
- The New York City Subway's 55th Street station (D, R, and W trains) lies above 13th Avenue.

The 13th Avenue station of the BMT Culver Line used to be over the avenue at 37th Street until it was demolished in 1975.

Private intercity bus lines serving the Hasidic community leave from 49th Street; these include buses to Williamsburg, Monroe, and Monsey.
