= Bravo TV =

Bravo TV may refer to:

- Bravo (American TV network), U.S. cable TV channel owned by NBCUniversal
- Bravo (British TV channel), former British television channel owned by Living TV Group, a subsidiary of British Sky Broadcasting
- Bravo (New Zealand TV channel), a New Zealand TV channel owned by NBCUniversal and operated by Sky Free
- Bravo TV (TV series), a German youth television show related to a German youth magazine called Bravo
- CTV Drama Channel, Canadian cable TV channel, branded as Bravo from 1995 to 2019

== See also ==
- Bravo (disambiguation)
