= Genesis Gaming Solutions =

US casino gaming company

Genesis Gaming Solutions Inc.
- Type: Private
- Industry: Casino gaming
- Founded: 1999
- Headquarters: 28420 Hardy Toll Rd #225, Spring, Texas 77373
- Area served: United States
- Products: BRAVO Pit; BRAVO Poker Live
- Website: genesisgaming.com

Genesis Gaming Solutions is a United States casino gaming company founded in 1999 and headquartered in Spring, Texas. Genesis Gaming provides casino gaming hardware and software that support casino and table management and player tracking systems.

BRAVO Pit, developed by Genesis, is a software application that assists casinos in the organization of poker games, including table management and player tracking.
