= Bravo (Saudi Arabia) =

BRAVO-TELECOM LTD. (bravO!)
- Type: Private shareholding company
- Industry: Wholesale business
- Founded: 2005
- Headquarters: Saudi Arabia
- Products: Push-to-talk, push to send, push to view, GPS, full mobile telephony service, SMS, packet-data
- Number of employees: 50+
- Website: https://www.bravo.sa

Bravo is a digital radio trunking operator in Saudi Arabia. Now part of the incumbent operator Saudi Telecom Company, it was originally a separate company known as Public Telecom Company under a BOT agreement with STC. It was launched in 2005 using Motorola's proprietary iDEN technology operating on the SMR-800 frequency band.

Bravo-Telecom's focus is professional radio service to the corporate and governmental sector, with no consumer-centric prepaid offering because the network is in partnership with the incumbent operator STC which runs its own GSM and 3G network under the commercial name of Aljawal which primarily addresses this sector.

The other two cellular operators launch a PTT service similar in function to the one offered by Bravo through its digital trunking network, but the former companies used a technology called PoC for this service.

In neighboring Jordan, Bravo-Telecom's sister company XPress operates the same system, which enables customers in both sides to place international PTT calls,

The company was owned by two shareholders, a local company called NASCO and the Dubai-based Wataniya Int'l which was later wholly acquired by Qatar-based Ooredoo in 2007.

In 2013, Bravo was acquired by the Saudi Telecom Company, Saudi Arabia's dominant telecommunications carrier, but continues operating a separate network in parallel to the "Unified Secure Communication Network of Saudi Arabia" (USeC) of the Ministry of the Interior.

In 2017, Bravo announced plans to acquire professional mobile radio (PMR) infrastructure from Airbus.

== See also ==
- iDEN technology explained
- XPress Telecom
- List of mobile network operators
