= Dyker Heights, Brooklyn =

Neighborhood in New York City

Dyker Heights
- Neighborhood in Brooklyn
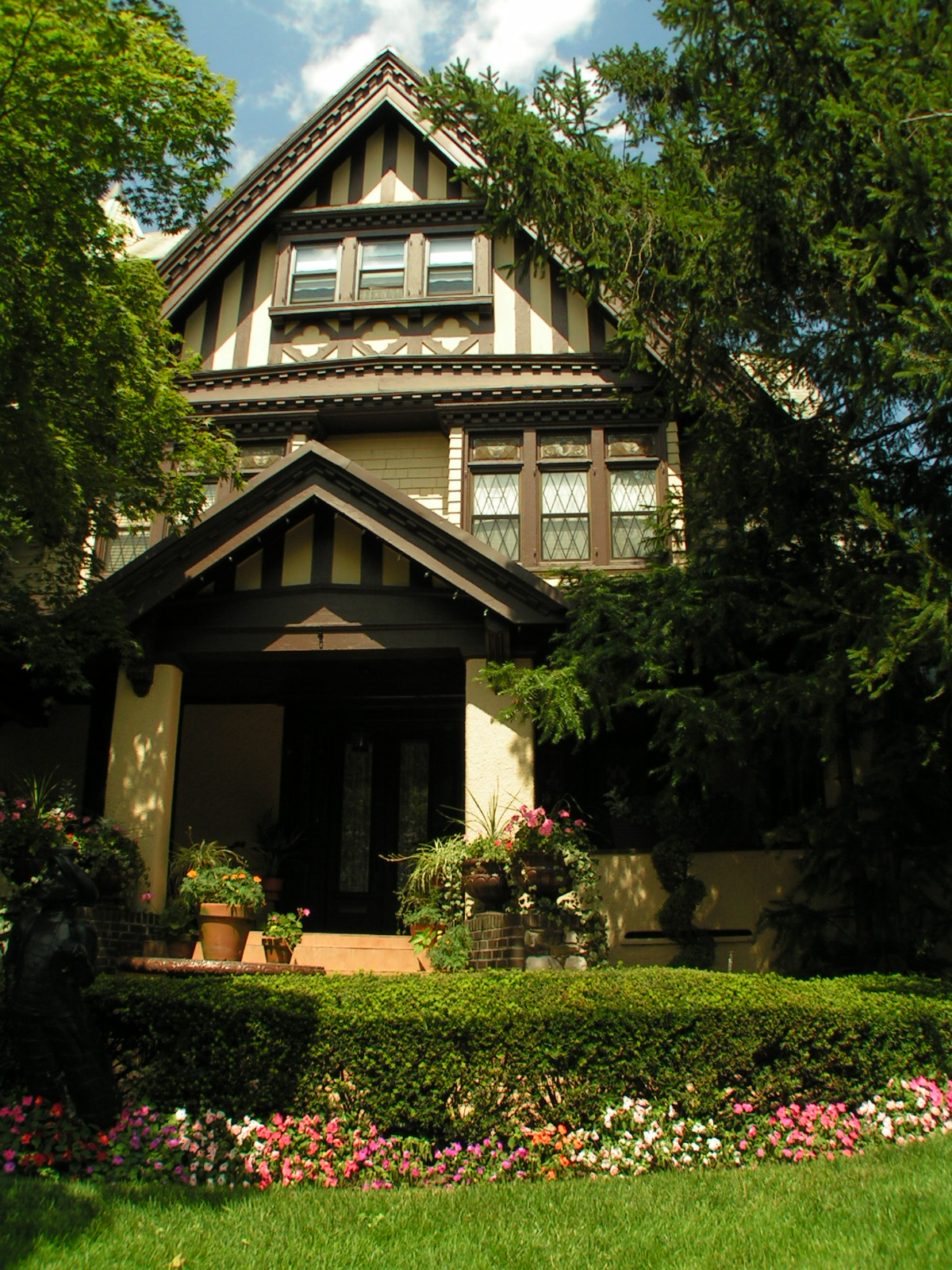
- The Saitta House, an original Dyker Heights home
- Nickname: Dyker
- Motto: "The Handsomest Suburb in Greater New York"
- Interactive map of Dyker Heights
- Coordinates: 40.620°N 74.007°W
- Country: United States
- State: New York
- City: New York City
- Borough: Brooklyn
- Community District: Brooklyn 10
- Developed: 1895–1902
- Developer: Walter L. Johnson
- Elevation: 51–110 ft (16–34 m)

Population (2010)
  - Total: 42,419
- Time zone: UTC−5 (Eastern)
  - Summer (DST): UTC−4 (EDT)
- ZIP Code: 11228
- Area code: 718, 347, 929, and 917

Dyker Heights is a mostly residential neighborhood in the southwest corner of the borough of Brooklyn in New York City. It occupies a hill between Bay Ridge, Bensonhurst, Borough Park, and Gravesend Bay. The neighborhood is bounded by 7th and 14th Avenues, 65th Street, and the Belt Parkway on the west, east, north, and south, respectively.

Dyker Heights originated as a speculative luxury housing development in October 1895 when Walter Loveridge Johnson developed a portion of woodland into a suburban community. It maintained its status as a wealthy neighborhood through the 20th century. During the height of his development, the boundaries were primarily between Tenth and Thirteenth Avenues and from 79th Street to 86th Street. The finest homes of the development were situated along the top of the 110-foot (34 m) hill, at about Eleventh Avenue and 82nd Street.

Dyker Heights has a suburban character with detached and semi-detached one-and two-family homes, many of which have driveways and private yards, which are uncommon in parts of New York City. The neighborhood contains tree-lined streets, and there are very few apartment buildings. Dyker Heights can be divided in roughly three sections. The southernmost section, south of 86th Street and east of 7th Avenue, contains Dyker Beach Park and Golf Course. The central section between Bay Ridge Parkway and 86th Street, and between 14th Avenue and Fort Hamilton Parkway, is more exclusive in character. The northern border of the neighborhood is more closely integrated with surrounding areas. The Dyker Heights Civic Association, founded in 1928, is a civic group that represents the community's interests. The area as a whole is known for its Christmas lighting displays, which are often elaborate.

Dyker Heights is part of Brooklyn Community District 10, and its primary ZIP Code is 11228. It is patrolled by the 68th Precinct of the New York City Police Department. Politically it is represented by the New York City Council's 43rd District.

== History ==
=== Early development ===
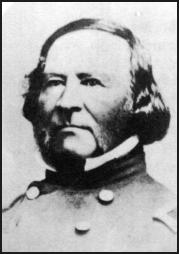
Brigadier General René Edward De Russy

The neighborhood of Dyker Heights lies within the boundaries of the then-Dutch town of New Utrecht settled in 1657. The area that is now known as Dyker Heights was not developed in the 17th or 18th century because the land was too sloped for farming; it remained common woodland until the mid-19th century. The trees of this forest were used by the townsfolk as a source of firewood and construction material. When the agricultural industry of New Utrecht changed from the farming grains to the cultivation of market garden produce, the trees were cleared for tomatoes, cabbages, and potatoes, among other produce.

The first house built at the top of the hill (what is now 11th Avenue and 82nd Street, at about 110 feet (34 m) above sea level) was built in the late 1820s by Brigadier General René Edward De Russy of the US Army. De Russy was a military engineer who built many forts in the US – from the Canada–US border and the eastern seaboard to the Gulf of Mexico and the Pacific coast – including Fort Hamilton in Brooklyn. Since this was the tallest natural point in southwest Brooklyn, he built his homestead here – it afforded a clear view of the harbor and its defenses, especially Fort Hamilton which was complete by November 1831. De Russy died in 1865 and his wife, Helen, sold the property in 1888 to Jane Elisabeth Loveridge and Frederick Henry Johnson.

=== Development by the Johnsons ===
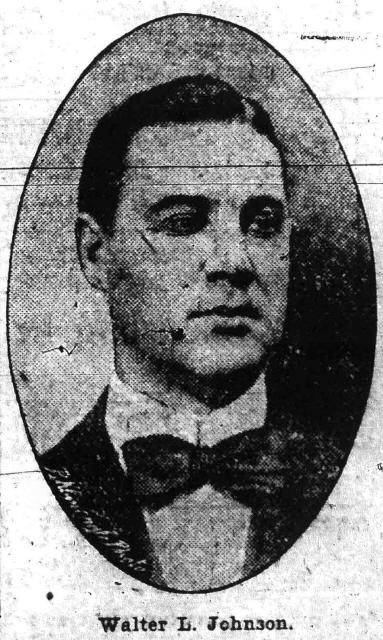
Walter L. Johnson, developer of Dyker Heights

According to the Brooklyn Eagle, Frederick Johnson did "much toward developing the locality in which he resided. He was the author of the original New Utrecht Improvement Bill, and an ardent advocate of the annexation of the Town to this City." The Town of New Utrecht was annexed to the City of Brooklyn on July 1, 1894. On January 1, 1898, the City of Brooklyn was annexed to the City of New York. Involved with real estate, Johnson was probably aware of the real estate pressures on and potential of the real estate in New Utrecht. With this in mind, he most likely purchased the De Russy estate with the intention of building an upscale residential neighborhood similar to Bensonhurst-by-the-Sea, built by James D. Lynch in 1880–1890 in the Bath Beach section of New Utrecht. At that time, the Real Estate Record claimed Bensonhurst-by-the-Sea was "the most perfectly developed suburb ever laid out around New York." The restrictions placed upon the property made Bensonhurst-by-the-Sea "a model settlement, where some of the most refined, intelligent and cultured of New York City and Brooklyn's citizens have built their homes."

Following Johnson's death on August 15, 1893, at the age of 52, his second son, Walter Loveridge Johnson, took over the real estate business and by October 1895 started Dyker Heights on his parents' property. Johnson named his development "Dyker Heights" after the Dyker Meadow and Beach, which his development overlooks. The meadow and beach received their name from either the Van Dykes (an original New Utrecht family) who built the dykes to drain the meadow, or for the dykes that the Van Dykes built. Johnson was able to develop this portion of New Utrecht woodland into a residential community by making necessary improvements to it. In 1890, the only roads present were Kings Highway, 86th Street, Denyse's Lane, and a small unnamed road near Tenth Avenue – none of which were paved and only 86th Street was a thoroughfare specifically planned as such. The remaining land was unimproved. Johnson continued Brooklyn's street grid south with macadam pavement, graded the properties, installed gas, water, telephone, and electricity lines, and planted sugar maple trees – seven on the avenues and twenty along the streets. This opened over two hundred more building sites between Tenth and 13th Avenues as well as between 79th and 86th Streets.

In 1895, Johnson, very much aware of the successful Bensonhurst-by-the-Sea, built three homes. His home was on the southwest corner of 11th Avenue and 82nd Street (across the Avenue from the home of his mother), Albert Edward Parfitt's home was on 82nd Street next to Johnson's, and the last, closest to Tenth Avenue, was the home of Arthur S. Tuttle who was Assistant Engineer of The Water Supply of The City Works Department of The City of Brooklyn. Parfitt was the architect of these three homes. Johnson's house burned down before 1900, Parfitt's was demolished by a developer in 1928 and replaced with seven, run-of-the-mill, fully detached, single-family homes, and Tuttle's house was remodeled over 10 years ago and clad in bright-white and sky-blue brick.

Throughout the infancy of the development, Johnson was able to use the print press to his advantage. He advertised his suburban homes heavily and stated that the high ground, magnificent ocean view, and careful restrictions made Dyker Heights the handsomest suburb in Greater New York. Based on the newspaper accounts, he was right. In 1896 Johnson built and sold thirty homes in Dyker Heights. By January 1897, the Brooklyn Eagle reported on his achievements. "Mr. Johnson has met with great success in the development of Dyker Heights and had probably done more business and made more sales during the past year than all the rest of the surrounding settlements combined." In April 1898 sales were still very strong. "Dyker Heights still holds its lead among the suburban sections in building operations, over forty houses having been erected there during the past year... and there are fully twenty more houses about to be built." One of its many advantages was the location, which according to the Brooklyn Eagle, "is one of the finest in Greater New York, commanding an extensive view of water from Sandy Hook to the New Jersey Palisades, with Staten Island and the shores of New Jersey directly in front." Still more praise in February 1899, "Dyker Heights has been one of the most successful and the most rapid in growth of any of the suburban settlements, over one hundred dwellings, costing from $5,000 to $25,000 each, having been erected there within the last two years."

=== Advantages of the development ===
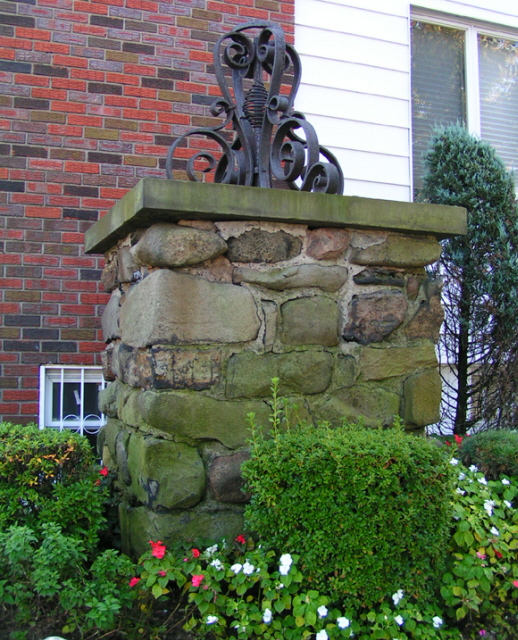
Massive stone pier outside a house in Dyker Heights

Dyker Heights Home for Blind Babies of the International Sunshine Society, c. 1908

In September 1899, The Wall Street Journal even reported on the advantages of the development, recommending it to "the busy man of Wall Street" because of "its magnificent transportation facilities... it can be reached via the Thirty-Ninth Street Brooklyn Ferry and Eighty-Sixth Street Nassau Line in 45 minutes." In addition, the article claimed that "the 45 minutes' trip between Dyker Heights and Wall Street by water and rail is as invigorating as the Dyker Heights climate is healthy-living. The rare opportunities afforded by Dyker Heights to the wealthy and to those in moderate circumstances are due largely to the energy, enterprise and good taste of its founder, Mr. Walter L. Johnson." A month later, The Wall Street Journal published "An Ideal Spot for a Home". From that article, one can clearly see why Dyker Heights was so successful. Its location and luxurious homes were first rate, "[Dyker Heights] is without a rival as to location, situated as it is at an elevation of [110] feet above the sea level, and is directly opposite the new Dyker Meadow Park... which will be the only seaside park in Greater New York." The article also explained the exclusiveness of the property, which can be seen in "its massive stone piers with heavy wrought-iron lamps and scrolls" that adorn the entrances. In December 1899 the Brooklyn Eagle reported that, "work has recently been commenced upon thirty high-class Houses, the demand for which runs a dead heat with the supply."

Johnson set very high standards for the community: the Wall Street Journal explained "the property is carefully restricted against all nuisances and no building can be erected upon a plot of less than 60 feet (18 m) in width by 100 feet (30 m) in depth, and each building must cost at least $4,000 and stand well back from the street." These regulations, which were similar to those of Bensonhurst-by-the-Sea, were active until 1915. However, the most desirable feature of the area was still the "uninterrupted view of the lower bay from The Narrows to Sandy Hook and Atlantic Ocean, [which] is one of the most magnificent in the country, and nowhere else in the consolidated city is there anything to compare it with. From here can be seen a marine panorama hard to beat." Dyker Heights was so desirous that important members of society flocked to it. The Brooklyn Eagle reported in December 1899 that this "drain" on the more established social neighborhoods such as Brooklyn Heights and those in Manhattan, "almost threatens to lower the social tone of the neighborhoods where this universal exodus is effecting a gradual change in the character of the population."

=== Late 19th and early 20th centuries ===
Property on 84th Street near 13th Avenue was made available to the International Sunshine Society in 1906 by lawyer, financier, and promoter George E. Crater Jr. The society was able to acquire the house for $11,000, roughly half the market value, and opened the Dyker Heights Home for Blind Babies on 1 November 1906. Cynthia W. Alden, Mary C. Seward, and other society officers worked with the New York City Board of Education to establish the first public kindergarten for blind children at the home in 1907. The original building is gone, but the work begun in Dyker Heights provided a legacy of significant reforms in the public education of blind children within New York and other regions of the United States.

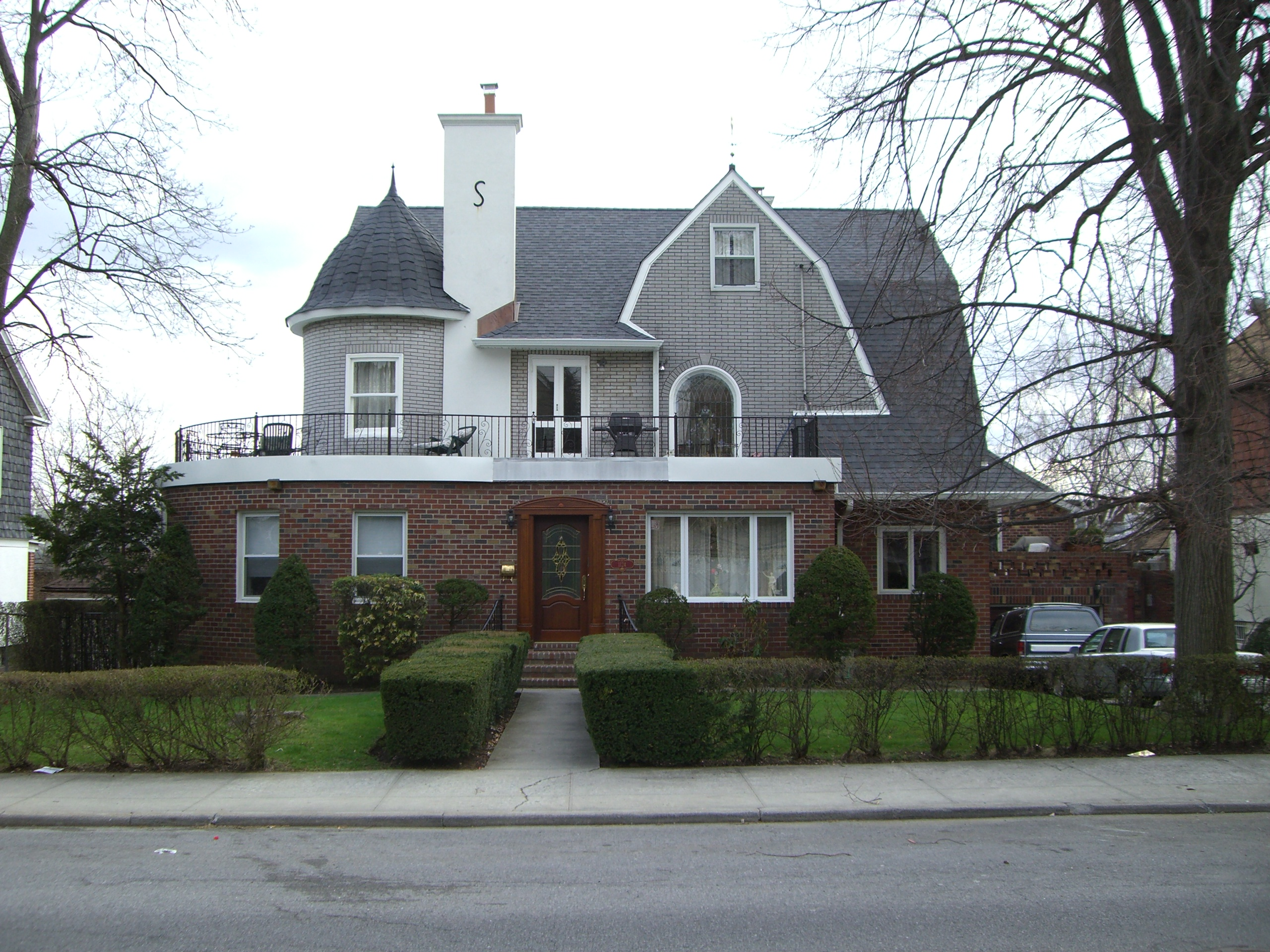
Constantine Schubert's home in Dyker Heights

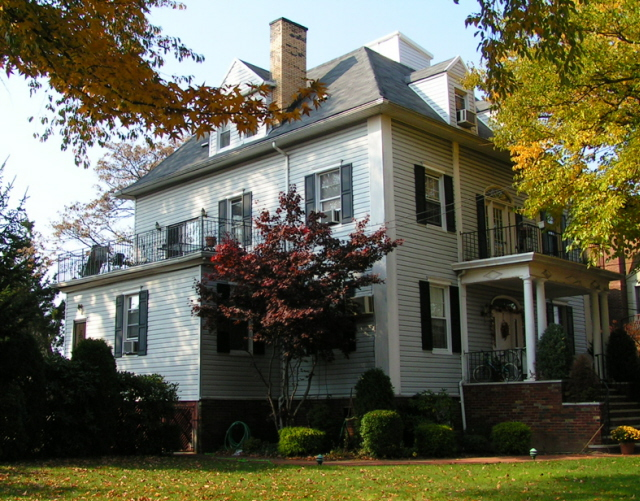
Dr. Lorenzo Ullo's home in Dyker Heights

Dyker Heights Club House

One of the many focal points of the neighborhood was the Dyker Heights Club, which started in October 1896. By spring of 1898 the club had a $30,000 clubhouse designed by Albert Edward Parfitt on an $8,500 lot, measuring 200×200, located on the northeast corner of 13th Avenue and 86th Street. Johnson moved his real estate office into the clubhouse and hired a full-time architect, Constantine Schubert, who was also a Dyker Heights homeowner. This grand, neo-classical building was demolished in 1929 by the Archbishop John Hughes Knights of Columbus Club, when they acquired the property for $60,000.

Early in the history of Dyker Heights, Johnson continually purchased consecutive tracts of land until the boundaries of Dyker Heights stretched from 79th Street in the north, roughly 86th Street in the south, Tenth Avenue to the west, and about 300 feet (90 m) east of 13th Avenue to the east. However, the boundaries of the Neighborhood of Dyker Heights are now defined by the Dyker Heights Post Office on the northwest corner of 13th and 84th Streets; along its northeast edge runs Bay Ridge Avenue; 16th Avenue is its southeast boundary; Fort Hamilton makes its southwest border; and Interstate 278 is the northwest limit.

== Demographics ==
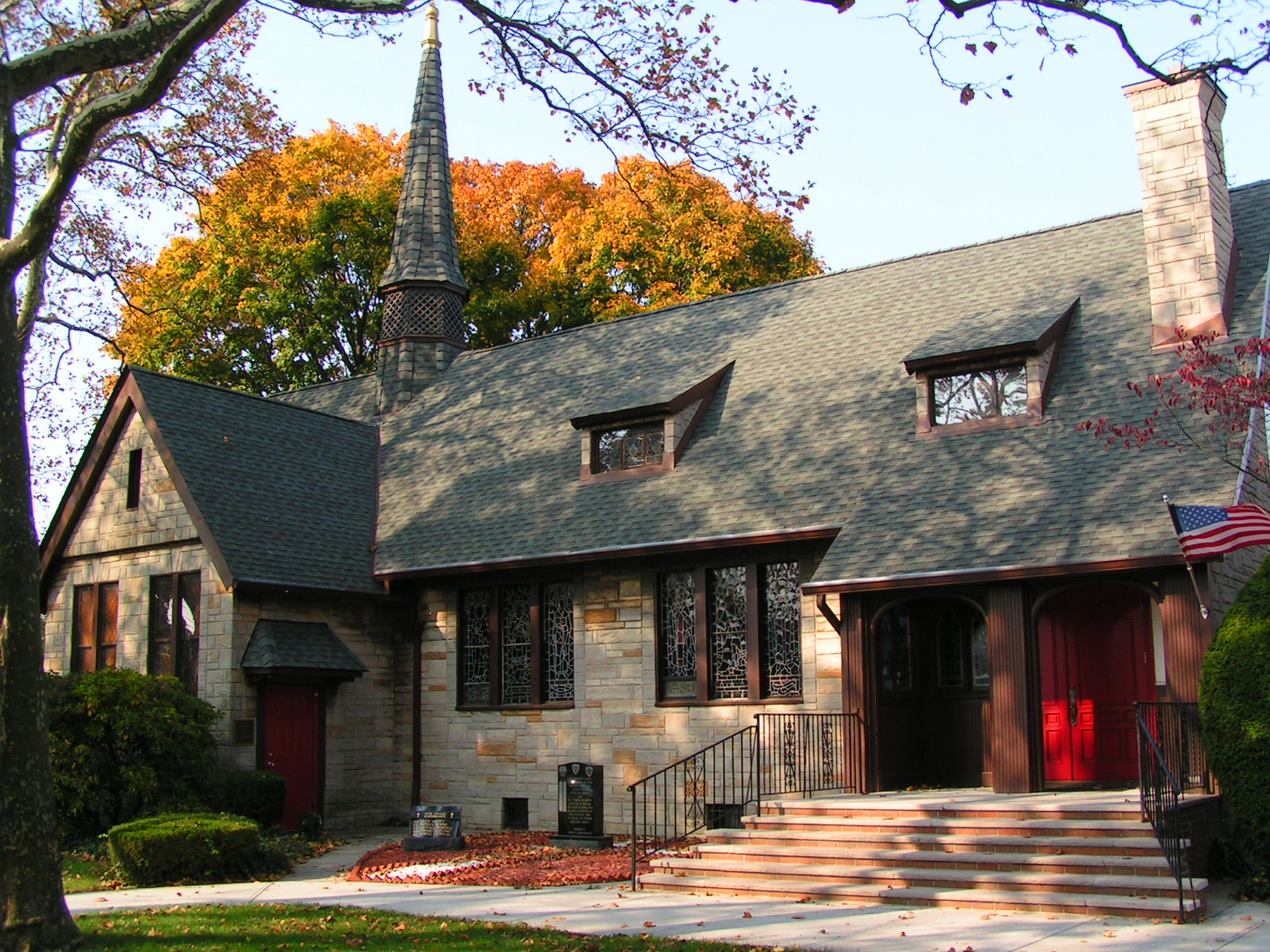
St. Phillips Church in Dyker Heights

Based on data from the 2010 United States census, the population of Dyker Heights was 42,419, an increase of 3,087 (7.8%) from the 39,332 counted in 2000.

The racial makeup of the neighborhood was 70.2% White, 0.1% African American, 0.0% Native American, 27.1% Asian, 0.0% Pacific Islander, 0.1% from other races, and 1.0% (430) from two or more races. Hispanic or Latino of any race were 5.9% of the population.

The entirety of Community Board 13 had 142,075 inhabitants as of NYC Health's 2018 Community Health Profile, with an average life expectancy of 83.1 years. This is higher than the median life expectancy of 81.2 for all New York City neighborhoods. Most inhabitants are middle-aged adults and youth: 20% are between the ages of 0–17, 34% between 25 and 44, and 25% between 45 and 64. The ratio of college-aged and elderly residents was lower, at 7% and 15% respectively.

As of 2016, the median household income in Community District 10 was $68,679. In 2018, an estimated 19% of Bay Ridge and Dyker Heights residents lived in poverty, compared to 21% in all of Brooklyn and 20% in all of New York City. One in twelve residents (8%) were unemployed, compared to 9% in the rest of both Brooklyn and New York City. Rent burden, or the percentage of residents who have difficulty paying their rent, is 49% in Bay Ridge and Dyker Heights, slightly lower than the citywide and boroughwide rates of 52% and 51% respectively. Based on this calculation, as of 2018, Bay Ridge and Dyker Heights are considered to be high-income relative to the rest of the city.

=== Cultural history ===
The first residents were either local government officials or wealthy professionals. For instance, I. M. De Varona was engineer of the Water Bureau, Clarence Barrow was ex-Fire Commissioner, William C. Bryant was current Fire Commissioner, George W. Dickinson was a cotton-goods merchant, W. Bennett Wardell was a retired judge, Richard Perry Chittenden was Assistant of the Corporation Counsel, Freeland Willcox was Secretary of the Cheeseborough Vaseline Company, and Eugene Boucher was longshoreman and insurance broker.

Since the 1940s, Dyker Heights has had a majority Italian-American population. The Brooklyn Eagle explained a problem Johnson had with a particular Italian family in a home "which at the time was owned by Walter L. Johnson, was occupied by an Italian family, to whom Mr. Johnson paid $600 to vacate it in order that the neighborhood of Dyker Heights, which is very carefully restricted, might have no objectionable features about it." By 1940 Dyker Heights was inhabited by a majority of people of Italian descent many of whom helped establish the Roman Catholic Shrine Church of Saint Bernadette (ca. 1935) on 13th Avenue between 82nd and 83rd streets.

Dyker Heights Boulevard, also known as 13th Avenue, contains many Italian-owned businesses. Dyker Heights Boulevard is the only commercial district in Dyker Heights and is the de facto center of the neighborhood.

Around 11th Avenue between 60th and 70th Streets lies a Coptic speaking Egyptian community. St. George Coptic Orthodox Church serves the community. The church was established in 1973.

However, since the 2000s, there has been a slow growing influx of Asian residents into the neighborhood and New York City Department of City Planning released a 2020 census data showing for the first time in history, the Asian population in the neighborhood has surpassed the white population. The Asian population residents are between 30,000 and 39,999 while the remaining White population residents are between 10,000 and 19,999. The 2020 census data also showed a small, but significant Hispanic population residents of 5,000 to 9,999.

== Housing ==
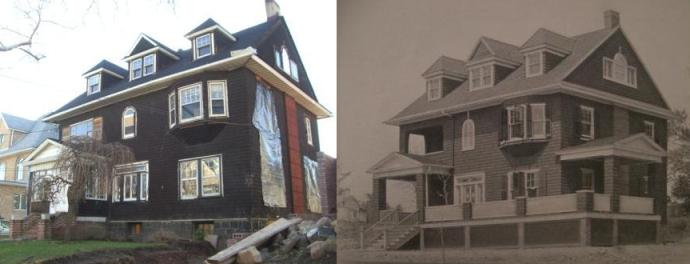
Time-lapse of a residence: seen in 2008 (left) and 1901 (right)

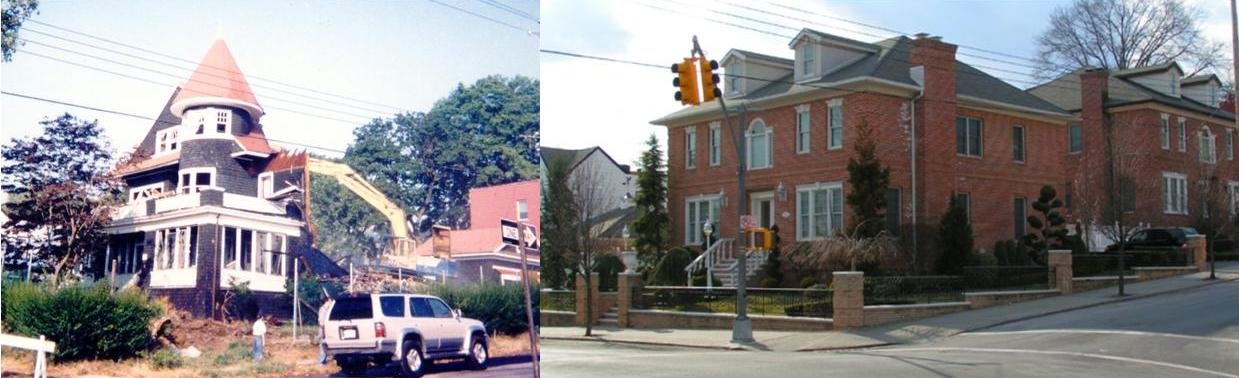
The demolition of the Chittensen House (left, in 1998) and the homes which replaced it (right, in 2006)

Dyker Heights' housing stock consists mostly of stately, single-family detached and semi-detached bungalows.

In December 1899, the Brooklyn Eagle wrote a very detailed description of the homes in Dyker Heights:

The typical Dyker Heights residences have five rooms each on the first and second floors and four rooms on the third. Upon entrance, the inmate or visitor is ushered into a hall twelve feet wide which runs back to the butler's pantry. To the right of this hall is the parlor and library and to the left the reception and dining rooms. The rear space is taken up by the kitchen, butler's pantry and washrooms with tiled floors. Birdseye maple is used in the finishing of the parlor and quartered oak in that of the library, one with mantles of the same wood in fancy tile finish. A large fireplace with ornamental andirons completes the mural decoration. The ceilings are ten feet high on the first floor, while nine feet is the elevation of the second and eight feet that of the third floor. Usually the dining room is fifteen feet square and finished off in quartered sycamore. Like the hall, the reception room is done off in quartered oak, but is circular in form and has a diameter of ten feet. In the kitchen is a glazed fireplace, while below stairs, speaking from a first floor level, are the cellar and laundry, with a depth of eight feet, and an asphalt double concrete floor. Of the five rooms on the second floor, one is a sitting room and the remainder sleeping apartments, all of which are finished in quartered oak and sycamore. A large bathroom with tiled floors takes up the remaining space of the second story. Rising to the third floor we find plain cypress as the invariable finish of the apartments, which comprise two servants' rooms, a card or sitting room and a billiard parlor wainscoted on the sides and provided with seats for the players and onlookers. It may be noted further that the reception room and dining room are also wainscoted six feet high.

Of the approximately 150 homes initially built by Johnson, about half remain; while the others have been razed and replaced by large Mediterranean villas, condos, as well as semi and fully attached homes. Very few of the newer homes fit into the historic context of Dyker Heights, and in contrast to Brooklyn's contemporaneous Ditmas Park and Prospect Park South developments, many of the original surviving homes have been extensively renovated and remodeled.

=== Christmas decorations ===
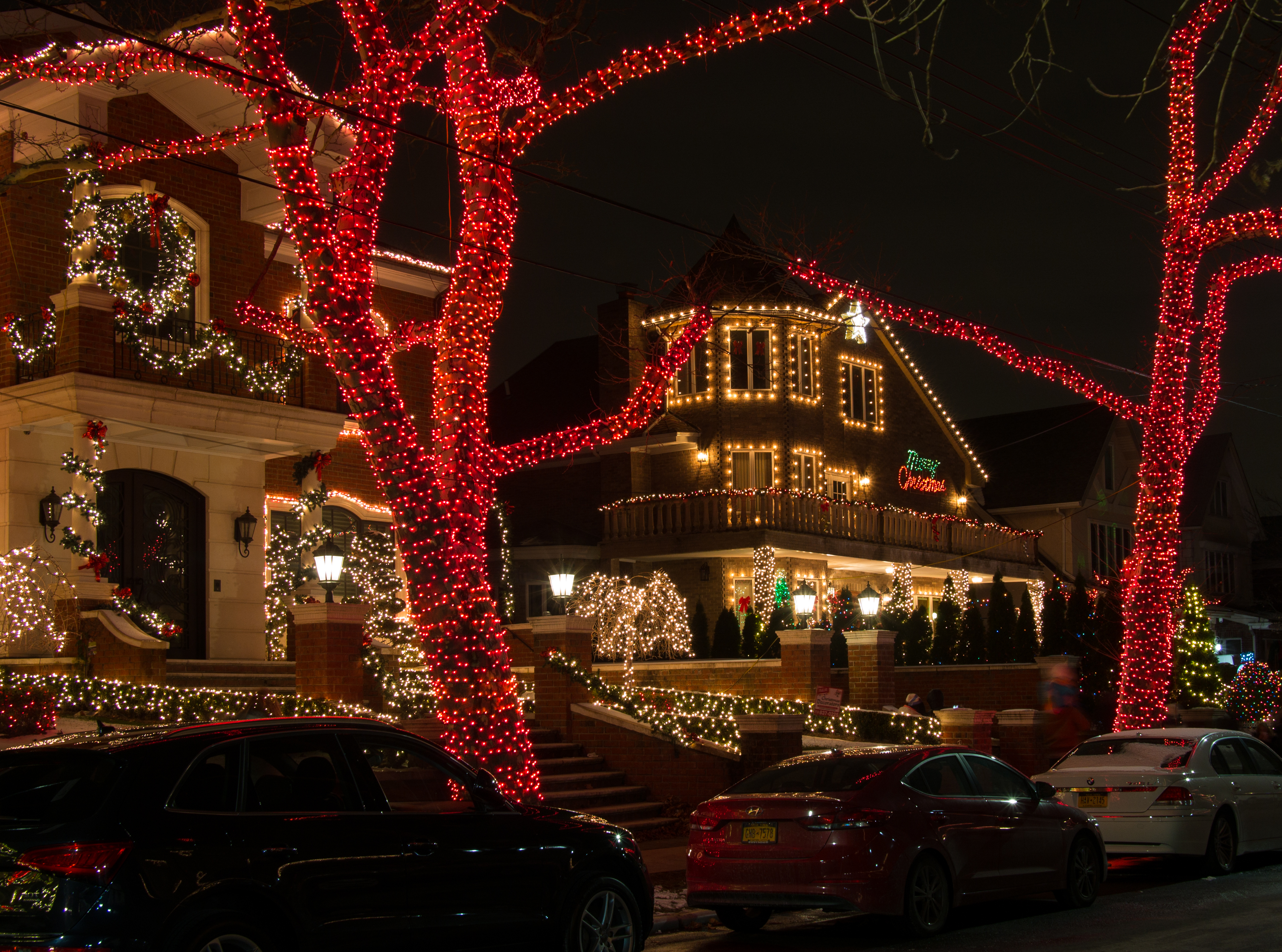
Decorated houses in Dyker Heights in December 2017

Dyker Heights is now most famous for its Christmas lights and decorations erected each year by its residents. It has been called "Con Ed's warmest heartthrob", the "undisputed capital of Christmas pageantry", and the "king of the Christmas lights". Christmas lights are now the core of the Dyker Heights identity, because the whole community, not just one home or one block, participates. As such, Dyker Heights has been referred to as "an epicenter of professionally-hung Christmas lights". Most holiday decorations in the area are not erected by homeowners, but by local decorating companies, but the cost of hiring professional decorators can vary greatly, from $1,000 to $20,000 or more, depending on the scale of the display; many companies also offer additional services, including the option to take down and store decorations.

Formally, the lighting and Christmas decorations begin on the last Thursday of November (Thanksgiving) and they remain until the first days of January, with mid-December being the days most visited by tourists.

Although in which December the lights began is unclear, newspaper reports and tours of the area suggest it started sometime in the 1980s. In 1985 one Lou Singer began running tours (Singer's Brooklyn) through the most elaborately light parts of Bensonhurst, Canarsie, Bay Ridge, and Dyker Heights where one could find "designer lighting". Since those initial 1980 reports, the lights of Dyker Heights have become increasingly popular with New Yorkers as newspaper articles, news programs, documentaries, and remotes were created. In 2000, Conan O'Brien filmed a remote for Late Night with Conan O'Brien in Dyker Heights. A PBS televised documentary "Dyker Lights" was produced in 2001 as an insight into the neighborhood with stories involving the Christmas celebration lights.

==== Notable decorations ====
Early on, the two most noted homes were on 84th Street, between 11th and 12th Avenues, directly across from one another. The home of Lucy Spata with her Santa theme at 1152 84th Street and that of Alfred Polizzotto with his Nutcracker motif at 1145 84th Street.

In December 1998, the Spatas' home was covered in lights, illuminated soldiers and choirboys, and other Christmas figures. The inside is decorated with 50 motorized dolls, miniature villages and many gifts. Outside Santa, played by her nephew, greets children and others who pass by.

The white mansion, owned by Alfred Polizzotto and his family, was adorned with a pair of 29-foot (8.8 m) high wooden soldiers which stood guard and wave their arms. The front lawn had rearing horses and a quartet of dancers. In 1988, Polizzotto was diagnosed with lymphoma, which was successfully treated the following year. To celebrate his triumph, Polizzotto mounted the display the following year and until his death. In 2001, Polizzotto died; however, his family continued the tradition in his honor for a few years, until stopping in 2020.

In 1996, the Casos, who moved to Dyker Heights in 1995 and have since relocated, had Midwood artist Carl Oliveri design Charles Dickens' "A Christmas Carol", which included 29 life-size figures on their front lawn at 1062 84th St.

== Political representation ==
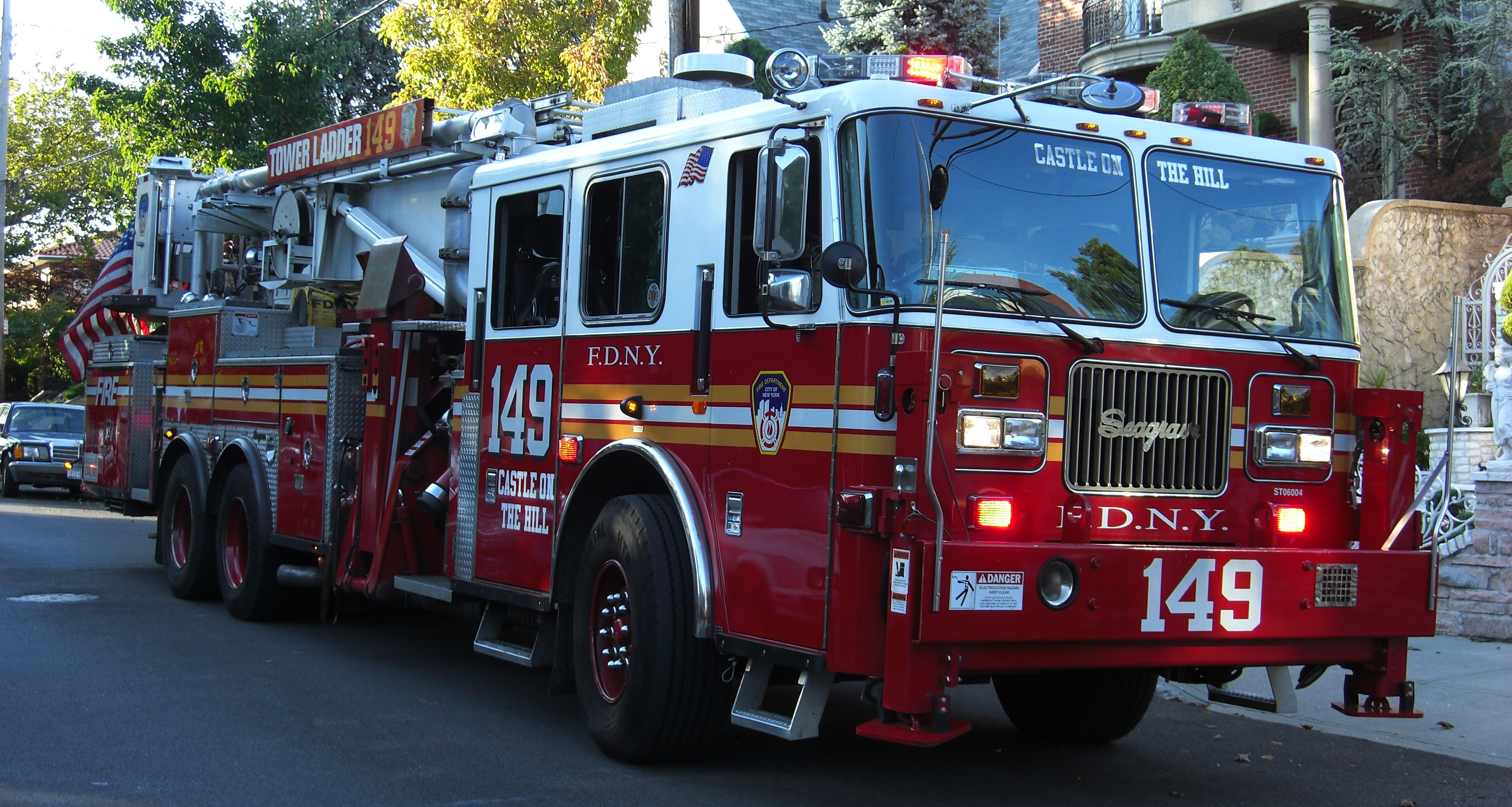
Ladder Company 149 in action on 85th Street

The neighborhood is part of New York's 11th congressional district, represented by Republican Nicole Malliotakis as of 2021. It is also part of the 22nd State Senate district, represented by Democrat Andrew Gounardes, and the 46th and 49th State Assembly districts, represented respectively by Democrats Mathylde Frontus and Peter J. Abbate Jr. Dyker Heights is located in New New York City's 47th City Council district, represented by Kayla Santosuosso.

Dyker Heights is served by Brooklyn Community Board 10. The Dyker Heights Civic Association is the neighborhood's unofficial civic association.

== Police and crime ==
The NYPD's 68th Precinct is located at 333 65th Street. The 68th Precinct ranked 7th safest out of 69 patrol areas for per-capita crime in 2010. As of 2018, with a non-fatal assault rate of 23 per 100,000 people, Bay Ridge and Dyker Heights' rate of violent crimes per capita is less than that of the city as a whole. The incarceration rate of 168 per 100,000 people is lower than that of the city as a whole.

The 68th Precinct has a lower crime rate than in the 1990s, with crimes across all categories having decreased by 88.6% between 1990 and 2018. The precinct reported 2 murders, 16 rapes, 59 robberies, 129 felony assaults, 96 burglaries, 387 grand larcenies, and 86 grand larcenies auto in 2018.

== Fire safety ==
The firehouse for the New York City Fire Department (FDNY)'s Engine Co. 284/Ladder Co. 149 is located at 1157 79th Street.

== Health ==
As of 2018, preterm births and births to teenage mothers are less common in Bay Ridge and Dyker Heights than in other places citywide. In Bay Ridge and Dyker Heights, there were 95 preterm births per 1,000 live births (compared to 87 per 1,000 citywide), and 11.4 births to teenage mothers per 1,000 live births (compared to 19.3 per 1,000 citywide). Bay Ridge and Dyker Heights has a high population of residents who are uninsured, or who receive healthcare through Medicaid. In 2018, this population of uninsured residents was estimated to be 15%, which is higher than the citywide rate of 12%.

The concentration of fine particulate matter, the deadliest type of air pollutant, in Bay Ridge and Dyker Heights is 0.0074 milligrams per cubic metre (7.4×10^{−9} oz/ft^{3}), lower than the citywide and boroughwide averages. Twelve percent of Bay Ridge and Dyker Heights residents are smokers, which is lower the city average of 14% of residents being smokers. In Bay Ridge and Dyker Heights, 28% of residents are obese, 15% are diabetic, and 31% have high blood pressure—compared to the citywide averages of 24%, 11%, and 28% respectively. In addition, 16% of children are obese, compared to the citywide average of 20%.

Ninety-two percent of residents eat some fruits and vegetables every day, which is slightly higher than the city's average of 87%. In 2018, 74% of residents described their health as "good", "very good", or "excellent", lower than the city's average of 78%. For every supermarket in Bay Ridge and Dyker Heights, there are 21 bodegas.

The Bay Ridge/Dyker Heights/Bensonhurst area does not have any hospitals. However, the Coney Island Hospital, NYU Langone Hospital – Brooklyn, and Maimonides Medical Center are located in nearby neighborhoods. Additionally, the BRAVO Volunteer Ambulance is run by the Bay Ridge Ambulance Volunteer Organization.

== Post office and ZIP Code ==
Dyker Heights is covered by ZIP Code 11228. The United States Post Office's Dyker Heights Station is located at 8320 13th Avenue.

== Education ==
Bay Ridge and Dyker Heights generally has a similar ratio of college-educated residents to the rest of the city as of 2018. While 46% of residents age 25 and older have a college education or higher, 19% have less than a high school education and 35% are high school graduates or have some college education. By contrast, 40% of Brooklynites and 38% of city residents have a college education or higher. The percentage of Bay Ridge and Dyker Heights students excelling in reading and math has been increasing, with reading achievement rising from 51 percent in 2000 to 52 percent in 2011, and math achievement rising from 49 percent to 71 percent within the same time period.

Bay Ridge and Dyker Heights' rate of elementary school student absenteeism is lower than the rest of New York City. In Bay Ridge and Dyker Heights, 8% of elementary school students missed twenty or more days per school year, compared to the citywide average of 20% of students. Additionally, 82% of high school students in Bay Ridge and Dyker Heights graduate on time, higher than the citywide average of 75% of students.

=== Schools ===
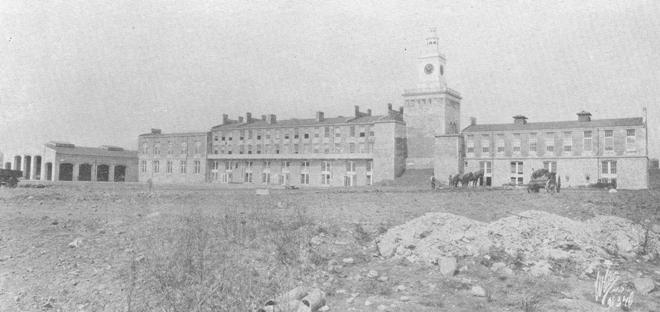
Poly Prep as seen in 1919

Public

- PS 127 McKinley Park (grades K–5)
- PS/IS 229 Dyker (grades PK–8)
- PS 204 Vince Lombardi (grades K–5)
- PS 176 The Ovington School (grades K–5)
- IS 187 Christa McAuliffe (grades 6–8)
- JHS 201 Madeleine Brennan (grades 6–8)
- JHS 259 William McKinley (grades 6–8)
- Middle School 407 School of Technology, Arts and Research (grades 6–8)

Early childhood education

- Lefferts Park Baptist Church Daycare (2 years old – 6 years old)

Parochial

- St. Bernadette Catholic Academy (grades PK–8; Roman Catholic)
- St. Ephrem School (grades PK–8; Roman Catholic)

Private

- Poly Prep Country Day School (grades PK–12)

=== Libraries ===
The Brooklyn Public Library has two branches in Dyker Heights. The Dyker branch is located at 8202 13th Avenue, near 82nd Street. The one-story structure, opened in 1974, was designed by Daniel Laitin and features a blue-green glazed facade.

The McKinley Park branch is located at 6802 Fort Hamilton Parkway, near 68th Street. The McKinley Park location was originally a "deposit station" with a small circulating collection, which opened in 1911. The library moved to the current 7,425-square-foot (689.8 m^{2}) building in 1959, and the structure was restored in 1995.

== Transportation ==
=== Public transportation ===
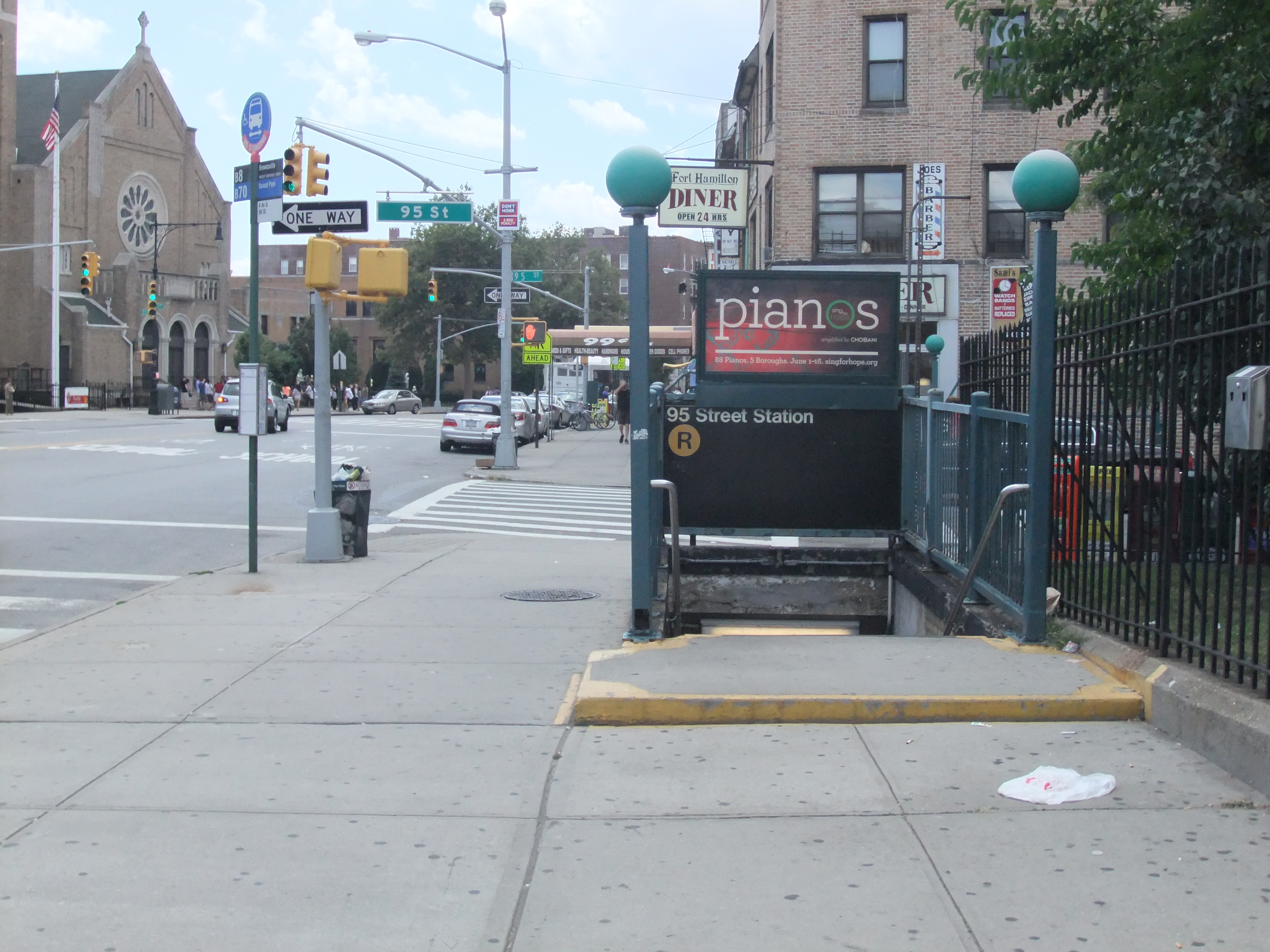
Entrance to 95th Street subway station

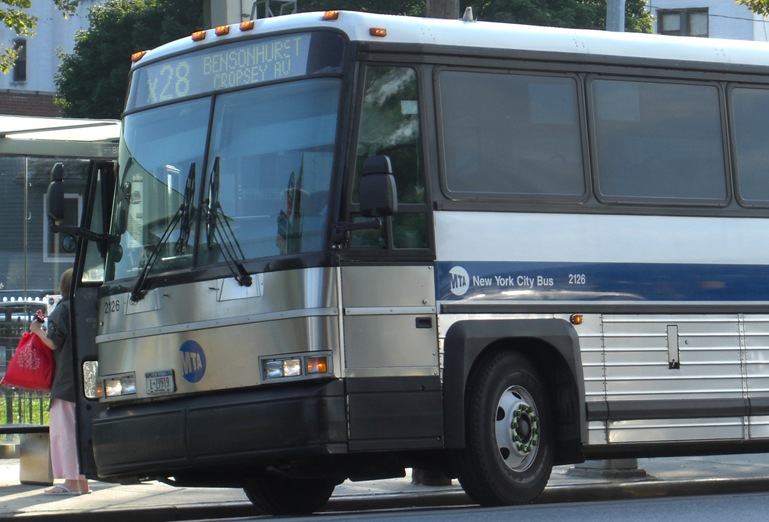
MTA's X28 bus on 86th Street in Dyker Heights

The center of Dyker Heights is not served directly by the New York City Subway, but its neighboring communities are; It can range from a 15-20 minute walk to a station in Bay Ridge, Borough Park or Bensonhurst depending on where in the neighborhood you are. Bay Ridge is served by the BMT Fourth Avenue Line (R train), with stations at Bay Ridge Avenue, 77th Street, 86th Street and 95th Street. The far south end of Borough Park is served by the BMT Sea Beach Line (N and W trains), with stations at Fort Hamilton Parkway and New Utrecht Avenue. Bensonhurst is served by the BMT West End Line (D, R, and W trains), with stations at 79th Street, 71st Street and 62nd Street.

Several local New York City Bus routes and two express routes serve Dyker Heights; the routes are B1, B4, B8, B16, B64, B70, X28, X38.

Dyker Heights is accessible by car via the Belt Parkway as well as the Interstate 278 (Verrazzano–Narrows Bridge to Staten Island, Gowanus Expressway, and Brooklyn-Queens Expressway).

=== Named streets ===
- Lieutenant William E. Coffey Square – 81st Street between 7th Avenue and Fort Hamilton Parkway. In the square stands one flagpole and two upright granite stones. One stone contains a bronze plaque inscribed with "In Memory Of Those Members Of Our Armed Forces Who Gave Their Lives For Our Country These Dead Shall Not Have Died In Vain" and the other stone has an incised scene of Iwo Jima.
- Marie Walsh Corner – southwest corner of 84th Street and 7th Avenue. Marie Walsh was a dedicated community activist being a member of the Dyker Heights Civic Association, Bay Ridge Community Council, and the Kings County Conservative Party. She also helped to establish the X28 bus. On June 10, 1996, Mayor Rudolph W. Giuliani signed the bill into law.
- Dyker Heights Boulevard – 13th Avenue between 86th Street and Bay Ridge Avenue. On August 8, 2001, Mayor Rudolph W. Giuliani signed the bill into law.
- Firefighter Dennis Patrick O'Berg 9/11 Memorial Way – 74th Street between 10th and 11th Avenues. Although he graduated from the State University of New York at Geneseo with a degree in accounting, O'Berg followed in his father's footsteps and became a firefighter. He was a member of Ladder 105, in the Prospect Heights section of Brooklyn. On October 20, 2003, Mayor Michael R. Bloomberg signed the bill into law.
- Robert F. Tipaldi 9/11 Memorial Way – 80th Street between 7th and 10th Avenues. Tipaldi was a 25-year-old trader with Cantor Fitzgerald on the 104th floor of World Trade Center Tower 1. On December 21, 2004, Mayor Michael R. Bloomberg signed the bill into law.
- Maria LaVache 9/11 Memorial Way – 12th Avenue between Bay Ridge Parkway and 76th Street. LaVache was a long-time receptionist for J&H's International Department but was transferred to another office on the 99th floor of the World Trade Center. On December 21, 2004, Mayor Michael R. Bloomberg signed the bill into law.
- Charles J. Mauro 9/11 Memorial Way – 72nd Street between 11th and 12th Avenues. On December 21, 2004, Mayor Michael R. Bloomberg signed the bill into law.
- Arturo Angelo Sereno 9/11 Memorial Way – 12th Avenue and 67th Street. On December 21, 2004, Mayor Michael R. Bloomberg signed the bill into law.
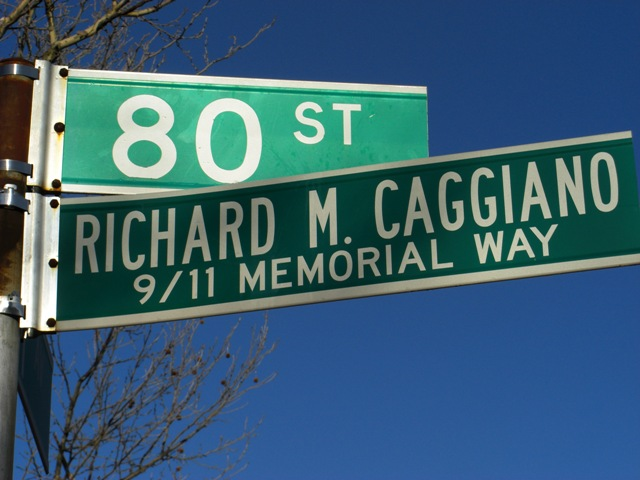
  Street sign for Richard M. Caggiano 9/11 Memorial Way
- Richard M. Caggiano 9/11 Memorial Way – 80th Street between 10th and 11th Avenues. Caggiano worked for Cantor Fitzgerald. On April 14, 2005, Mayor Michael R. Bloomberg signed the bill into law.
- Frederick I. Ergang Way – 12th Avenue and Bay Ridge Avenue. Having been raised in Borough Park, he was principal of P.S. 176 at 69th Street and 12th Avenue from 1973 until his retirement in 1998. At the time of his retirement he had the second longest tenure of any educator in the city of New York. On May 5, 2004, Mayor Michael R. Bloomberg signed the bill into law.
- Det. Frank P. Collins Avenue – 72nd Street and 7th Avenue. Collins was a sergeant in the United States Army, where he toured Bosnia, and an officer with New York City Police Department, working as a narcotics detective in the 63rd precinct. He died in a motorcycle accident on June 12, 2002. On May 5, 2004, Mayor Michael R. Bloomberg signed the bill into law.
- Giuseppe "Joe" Papandrea Way – 86th Street between 15th and 16th Avenues. Born in Calabria, Italy, Papandrea immigrated to Brooklyn. A leukemia survivor, he was killed by a hit and run driver on this block on January 29, 2002. On May 5, 2004, Mayor Michael R. Bloomberg signed the bill into law.
- De Russy Drive – Circular drive in front of the Dyker Beach Golf Course Club House, connecting 7th Avenue with 86th Street. From approximately 1870 to 1930, an earlier 'De Russy Street' ran within this same parcel, as the northernmost section of the golf course was 92nd Street. This street ran perpendicular to 86th Street and some 130 feet (40 m) west of 11th Avenue and it was demapped when the park was expanded northward in the 1930s. Both the Dyker Heights Civic Association and the Dyker Heights Historical Society were instrumental in the naming of the street after General Rene E. De Russy. It was redesignated in July 2009.
- Walter L. Johnson Corner – 82nd Street and 11th Avenue, southwest corner. Johnson developed Dyker Heights in about 1895 to 1905. This was the corner on which he built his house, the first at Dyker Heights. The Dyker Heights Civic Association, the Dyker Heights Historical Society, and Council Member Vincent J. Gentile, of the 43rd district, were instrumental in the naming of this corner. On December 28, 2009, Mayor Michael R. Bloomberg signed the bill into law.
- Hank Vogt Way – at the intersection of 85th Street and 7th Avenue. In 1974, Vogt established, and became the first chair of the Bay Ridge Ambulance Volunteer Organization. He was also Parade Chairman of the Ragamuffin Parade for many years as well as chairman of Planning Board 10. Council Member Gentile helped secure the corner's redesignation. On December 28, 2009, Mayor Michael Bloomberg signed the bill into law.

== Churches ==
- Shrine Church of Saint Bernadette (Roman Catholic)
- St. Rosalia-Regina Pacis Parish (Roman Catholic)
- St. Ephrem's (Roman Catholic)
- St. Philip's (Episcopal)
- Lefferts Park Baptist Church (Independent Baptist)
- St. George (Coptic Orthodox) Church of Brooklyn.

== Park and golf course ==
Dyker Playground at the northeastern corner of Dyker Beach Park

Southwestern Dyker Heights contains the Dyker Beach Park and Golf Course, a public park and a municipal, 18-hole, championship golf course.

== Notable residents ==
Notable current and former residents of Dyker Heights include:

- Scott Baio (born 1960), actor
- Maria Bartiromo (born 1967), television host
- Anthony Fauci (born 1940), Director of the National Institute of Allergy and Infectious Diseases and one of the lead members of the White House Coronavirus Task Force regarding the COVID-19 pandemic grew up in Dyker Heights, above his family's neighborhood pharmacy.
- Arnaldo Ferraro (born 1936), politician who served in the New York State Assembly
- Wenjian Liu (1982–2014), NYPD officer, died in a 2014 shooting of NYPD officers
- Adam Ottavino (born 1985), baseball pitcher for the St. Louis Cardinals, Colorado Rockies, New York Yankees, Boston Red Sox and New York Mets.
- Joe Rollino (1905–2010), an original Coney Island Strongman
- Gregory Scarpa (1928–1994), caporegime and hitman for the Colombo crime family, who was an FBI informant
- Rosanna Scotto (born 1958), TV news anchor, grew up in Dyker Heights.
