= Saitta House =

Historic house in Brooklyn, New York

- U.S. National Register of Historic Places
- New York State Register of Historic Places
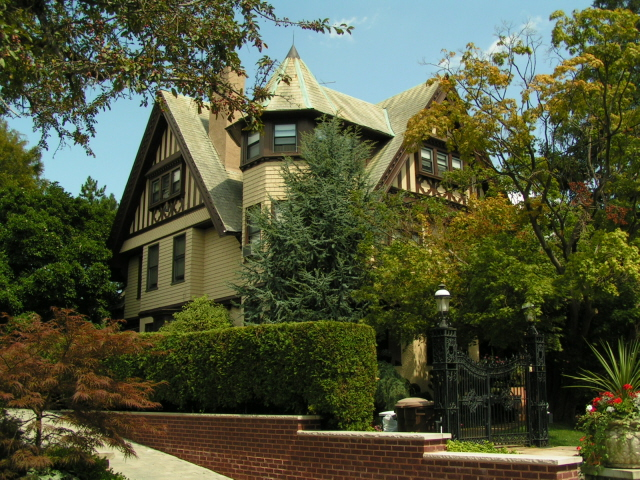
- Side view of the Saitta House

- Location within New York City Location within New York Location within the United States
- Location: 1135 84th St., Brooklyn, New York
- Coordinates: 40°37′2″N 74°0′59″W
- Area: less than one acre
- Built: 1899
- Built by: P. J. la Note
- Architect: John J. Petit
- Architectural style: Queen Anne
- NRHP reference No.: 07000480
- NYSRHP No.: 04701.015969

Significant dates
- Added to NRHP: May 30, 2007
- Designated NYSRHP: August 4, 2007

The Saitta House is a two-and-a-half-story, single-family Queen Anne style dwelling in the Dyker Heights section of Brooklyn, New York City, United States.

It was completed c. 1899 by architect John J. Petit and builder P.J. la Note for Beatrice and Simone Saitta (pronounced: sigh-eat-a). The home is located on the north side of 84th Street between Twelfth Avenue to the east and Eleventh Avenue to the west. The home reportedly cost $14,000 to build and the 8,000 sq ft (700 m^{2}) of land cost $2,700.

The Saitta House is significant in the area of architecture as a remarkably intact, high-style example of Queen Anne residential architecture, and for its association with the planning and development of Dyker Heights, a turn-of-the-20th-century suburban development in Brooklyn. No other house in Dyker Heights retains so much of its original architectural and structural components – both interior and exterior – as the Saitta House. The house was architect-designed for an affluent Dyker Heights family, and built ca. 1899 by craftsmen who came from Italy and lived on the premises during construction. Architect John J. Petit's work can be found elsewhere in Brooklyn, especially in the Prospect Park South Historic District (which is listed on National Register of Historic Places). The Saitta House was listed on both the State and National Register of Historic Places in 2007.

== Gallery ==
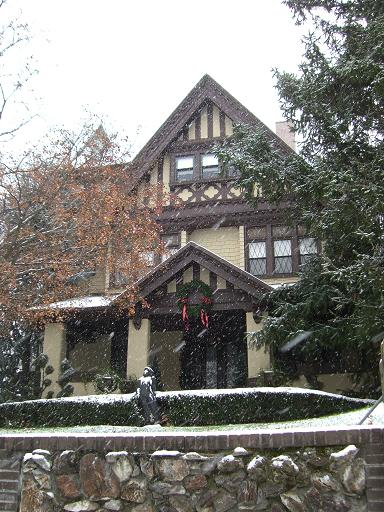
The Saitta House during the winter

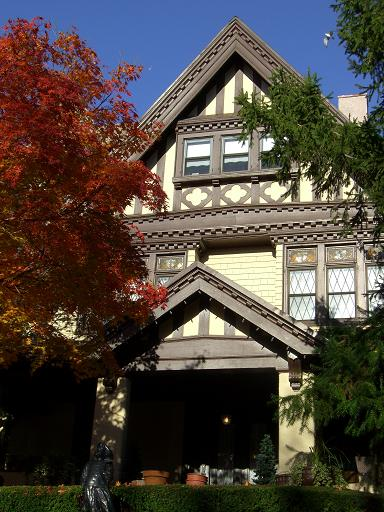
The Saitta House during the summer

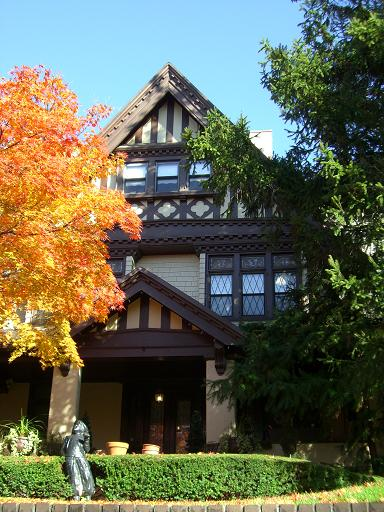
The Saitta House during the fall

== See also ==
- National Register of Historic Places listings in Brooklyn
