= XPress Telecom =

Former Jordani telecommunication company

New Generation Telecommunication Company LTD. (XPress)
- Company type: Private shareholding company
- Industry: Communications Services
- Founded: 2002
- Headquarters: Amman, Jordan
- Key people: Sharif Saifi, Chairman
- Products: Push-to-talk, GPS, full mobile telephony service, SMS, packet-data
- Number of employees: 100

XPress Telecom was a wireless telecommunication operator in Jordan. It has been shut down because of financial problems. It holds a digital trunking radio system license from the country's telecommunication regulatory body, the TRC; the technology used is Motorola's proprietary iDEN technology operated on the SMR-800 frequency band.

The company primarily targets the corporate market with a range of services essential for this sector, such as professional radio service (also known as Push-To-Talk or PTT), regular mobile telephony and messaging services, A-GPS-based tracking services, and wireless data services. The company also provides prepaid services for individual customers.

XPress Jordan ceased trading in 2010.

XPress's sister company Bravo Telecom operates the same system in neighboring Saudi Arabia, one advantage of that is that customers of either network can place international push-to-talk calls, similar service is available between Sprint Nextel iDEN network subscribers and their counterparts in other countries such as Nextel in Mexico and Telus iDEN subscribers in Canada.

== See also ==
- iDEN Technology explained
- List of mobile network operators
