= Bravo (application) =

- Developer(s): Genesis Gaming Solutions
- Initial release: 2007
- Website: www.bravopokerlive.com

BRAVO Pit and BRAVO Poker is software designed by Genesis Gaming Solutions for player ratings and pit management utilizing electronic data collection. Bravo Pit allows casino management to organize tables for house games. BRAVO poker allows management and players to view active number of tables, games players and promotions.

== Bravo Poker Live ==
Bravo Poker Live is an app release by Genesis Gaming in October 2011 for smartphones which allows players to view the number of tables, types of games, tournament information, and casino bonuses offered. Players can see how many tables are playing at any time as well as the number of players at each table. The application is used by many casinos across America.
