= BRAVO Volunteer Ambulance =

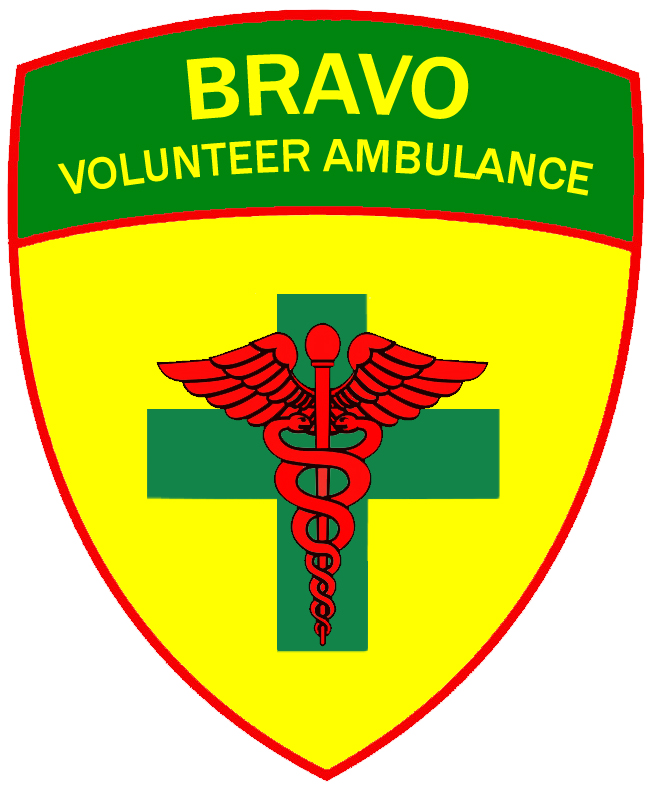
- BRAVO's Logo
- Abbreviation: BRAVO VAS
- Formation: 1974
- Type: Volunteer Ambulance
- Location: 8507 7th Avenue
- Region served: Bay Ridge, Dyker Heights, Fort Hamilton
- Services: Emergency Medical Services
- President: Tony Napoli
- Vice President of Administration: Adam Gottlieb
- Vice President of Operations: David Aspiazu
- Vice President of Finance: Joseph Marrese
- Board of directors: Pamela J. Carlton
- Website: www.bravoambulance.org

BRAVO Volunteer Ambulance is a volunteer ambulance organization which provides 24/7 emergency medical services to the neighborhoods of Bay Ridge, Fort Hamilton and Dyker Heights in Brooklyn, New York. Its area is bordered by 60th Street to the north, 14th Avenue to the east, and New York harbor to the west and south, including the Verrazzano–Narrows Bridge. BRAVO an all volunteer organization, primarily supported by donations.

== History ==
Bay Ridge, at the south-western point of Brooklyn, had notoriously slow ambulance response times. Recognizing a need to improve on the nearly hour-long response for a city or hospital-based ambulance, members of the community came together to found a local team of dedicated volunteers. Led by Community Board Chairman Hank Vogt, a handful of civic leaders, with the assistance of John Rusin, began to gather documentation from the NYS Volunteer Ambulance Association and the Board of Health to justify the need for a volunteer ambulance service in this community. Inspired by the film Rio Bravo, the name was selected to reflect the caliber of dedication needed to provide such a service. The name is also a backronym, standing for Bay Ridge Ambulance Volunteer Organization.

With additional support from politicians, religious groups and civic associations, BRAVO was able to secure a charter and the necessary certifications to operate. The first meeting for members was held on January 24, 1974, in which BRAVO accepted 103 applications for new members. BRAVO opened its doors in a location found by Councilman Angelo J. Arculeo. On July 4, 1974, BRAVO responded to its first call, officially providing EMS to Bay Ridge. After only a month, BRAVO was able to extend service to provide ambulance coverage 24-hours per day. Call volume was so high, the organization purchased its second vehicle to increase emergency response. BRAVO boasted response times of under 5 minutes throughout the community.

BRAVO is headquartered at 85th Street and 7th Avenue. Due to state recognition of superior service, BRAVO volunteers were selected to join New York State's new Advanced Emergency Technician program.

== Current operations ==
BRAVO currently operates 2 New York State Department of Health certified ambulances, designated BRAVO 1 and BRAVO 2. These ambulances are equipped beyond state protocols and are maintained by the operations department. BRAVO also has a special personnel transportation vehicle, designated BRAVO 4, which does not carry patients. It is commonly seen at special events and as a back-up vehicle. BRAVO also has several bicycles stocked with equipment to serve as bike patrol.

== Membership ==
BRAVO accepts applications for volunteers year-round and hosts new member interviews periodically. Potential members are interviewed by a committee of current BRAVO members and have to pass a background check. There are no prerequisites to volunteer with BRAVO, but members must be certified as an EMT-B or higher to ride on the ambulance. Non-EMT members may serve as corps dispatchers. After satisfactory experience as a dispatcher, members can apply for a New York State voucher which covers the cost of the EMT class. Mandatory orientation and training is provided by the training department to new members. Members must be over the age of 18, but do not have to reside in the areas served.

== Training ==
BRAVO has its own training department and classroom, which is used for both internal and external medical trainings. BRAVO offers mandatory training for its EMTs, which include knowledge in emergency dispatching, situational awareness, weapons of mass destruction, and mass-casualty incidents. BRAVO also offers its members continuing medical education courses throughout the year in a variety of topics, and aids members in retaining CPR, AED and First Aid certification. BRAVO offers courses to the community in CPR, AED and First Aid. The Training Department is overseen by the Vice President of Operations.

== Youth squad ==
BRAVO has a Youth Squad available to teenagers between the ages of 14 and 18. Established in an effort to increase recruitment, the Youth Squad operates as a stepping stone and volunteer opportunity for High School students. Youth Squad members do not need any prior training and are instructed in CPR, First Aid, and vital signs. Youth Squad joins the general membership at special events, particularly holiday collections, parades and festivals. Youth Squad members are also able to take shifts as observing dispatchers and join the general membership when they turn 18. The Youth Squad is overseen by advisors and the Executive Vice President.

== Leadership ==
=== Senior Officers ===
- President - Anthony Napoli
- Vice President of Administration - Adam Gottlieb
- Vice President of Operations - David Aspiazu
- Vice President of Finance - Joseph Marrese

=== Officers ===
- Community Affairs - Amy Christodoulou
- Training Officer - Kris Nelson
- Equipment Officer - Joseph Culmine
- Director of IT - Anthony L. Paduano
- Director of Security - Danny Masterson
- Director of Human Resources - Laura Gottlieb

=== Board of directors ===
- Phyllis Antoniello
- Pamela Carlton (chair)
- Jory Guttsman
- James Koutsavlis
- Anthony Napoli (President)
- Diane Napoli
- James Nealon
- Anthony L. Paduano
- Janet Perry
- Dr. Lou Soloff MD
- Jay Swithers
- Michael Tepedino
