= Dyker Beach Park and Golf Course =

Public park in Brooklyn, New York

Coordinates: 40°36′39″N 74°01′09″W

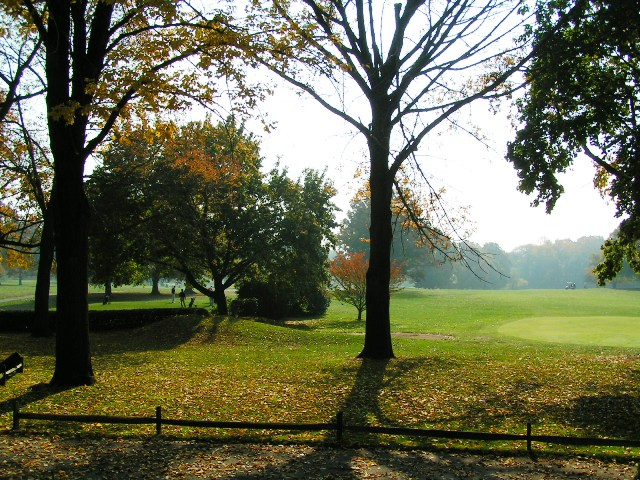
The course

The Dyker Beach Park and Golf Course is a public park and a municipal, 18-hole, championship golf course in the southernmost part of Dyker Heights, Brooklyn, in New York City, United States. The area stretches from the Belt Parkway in the south to 86th Street in the north, between 7th Avenue on the west and 14th Avenue on the east.

The course totals 217 acres and includes 6,548 yards of golf. Both the park's and the course's roots go back more than 100 years, and it is one of the most played public golf courses in the nation.

The golf course is managed by the American Golf Corporation, which not only won the contract to run the majority of New York City courses in 1999 but also renovated and expanded the club house in 2007-2008. Dyker Beach Golf Course is one of the oldest golf courses in the United States and second oldest in New York City, behind Van Cortlandt Golf Course, in the Bronx. The course is open all year round so long as weather conditions allow for play.

== History ==
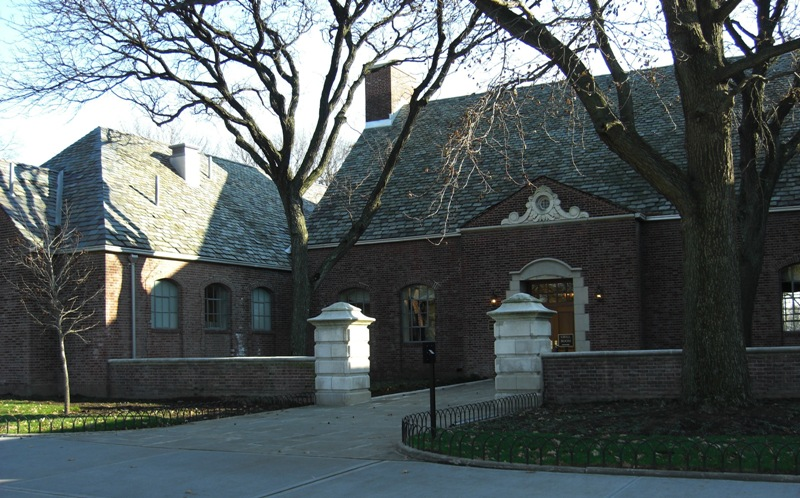
The main entrance of the club house

The park officially dates back to 1895, but its use as public land goes back to the times of the Canarsee Indians and the original New Utrecht Dutch settlers who referred to it as the "common land." The Indians and the Dutch were unable to farm the land or to build houses on it because it was mainly meadows, marsh, and swamps. During the 17th century, the Van Dyke family tried to drain and reclaim this marshy land by building dykes. Thus the origins of the park's name – after the Van Dyke family who built dykes or the dykes that the Van Dykes built.

The park evolved in four stages between 1895 and 1934, from upwards of eight parcels of land. Starting in 1895, the City of Brooklyn secured the first parcel, which stretched from the shore of Gravesend Bay to about 92nd street, and hired the landscape architecture firm of Olmsted, Olmsted and Eliot to design a 50-acre (200,000 m^{2}) park, to be "the only seaside park in Greater New York." It was to include a saltwater lagoon, children's playgrounds, bathhouses, lawns, and drives along the shore. According to the NYC Parks Department, the 1896 Annual Report of the Brooklyn Parks Department claimed that Dyker Beach Park would be the "finest seaside park in the world." Although bathhouses were erected and roads were constructed, the plans were revised in 1911 by Mr. Charles D. Lay, a former landscape architect for the Park's Department, who proposed to decrease the size of the lagoon and to add concert groves. In 1918 work began to fill the swampy areas of the park.

Prior to the 1920s, land stretching from 92nd Street to 86th Street was privately owned. The Dyker Meadow Land and Improvement Company owned the largest parcel and leased the land to both the Dyker Golf Club and Marine and Field Club, who used the Dyker Heights Club House, built in 1898, as their golf club house. In February 1916, the Poly Prep Country Day School, which was moving from 99 Livingston Street in Downtown Brooklyn to Dyker Heights, was unsuccessful in its attempts to purchase this parcel for their new county day school, as they were some $80,000 short. Thus, the land was sold to the NYC Parks Department. However, Parks Commissioner Raymond V. Ingersoll, who had two boys at Poly, offered the school a 25-acre (100,000 m^{2}) site on 92nd Street and 7th Avenue, which was donated to the Parks Department by Frederic B. Pratt, the Chairman of the Brooklyn Committee on City Planning. The school graciously accepted the offer and constructed a neo-Georgian school, which still functions today in this same location.

According to the Parks Department, four additional parcels of land were acquired between 1924 and 1927 by assignment and condemnation and another three lots were transferred to the department in 1934, which concluded the expansion of the park. These later expansions unmapped many streets which ran between 92nd and 86th streets, one such street was ‘De Russy Street’ which was built in the 1870s. In 2008, the New York City Department of Parks and Recreation agreed to name the circular driveway in front of the Dyker Beach Golf Course Club house in his honor.

In 1935, the Club House was constructed, designed by architect John Van Kleek. This building was renovated and expanded in 2008 by American Golf Corporation to house all golf operations as well as a wedding ceremony and reception hall which can accommodate 300 patrons.

Dyker Beach Golf Course was run by the New York City Parks Department until 1984, when operations were turned over to a private operator, American Golf Corporation.

Today, besides the 18-hole golf course and the catering center, the park has baseball, football, and soccer fields as well as bocce, basketball, handball, and tennis courts.

== Usage of the course ==
During the 1950s and 1960s, Dyker Beach Golf Course was the world's busiest, with over 100,000 rounds played annually.

In 1965, a total of 103,581 rounds were played. A golf getaway located in the heart of Brooklyn, it was one of the most played golf courses in the United States in the 1960s, averaging over 350 golfers a day during the season. Many of its golfers are locals who line up early in the morning in order to get a number for a round of golf.

=== Notable golfers ===
- Willy "Wiffy" Cox was the course's golf pro from 1921 to 1935.
- The five Strafaci brothers were all regulars at the course.
- Thomas Strafaci served as golf pro at Dyker, as did his son Thomas Strafaci Jr.
- In the 1970s, Tiger Woods’ father, then-US Army Lt. Col. Earl Woods learned to play the game in 1972 while stationed at Fort Hamilton.
- In 1898, Mungo Park Jr. was the club professional for the Dyker Meadow Club

=== Golf clubs ===
Dyker Beach Park is also home to four golf clubs that play on the course: the Shore View Golf Club, incorporated in 1930, one of the oldest public men's golf clubs in the United States; the Brookridge Ladies Club, also one of the older public golf clubs in the country; the Sand Trappers Senior Golf Club, that plays on Tuesdays and caters to older golfers; and a new club, Dyker Beach Women's Golf Club, that plays on Tuesday and Sunday mornings.
