= Bravo TV (Argentina) =

Argentine commercial television network

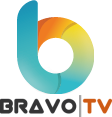
- Type: Free-to-air television network
- Country: Argentina

Programming
- Language: Spanish
- Picture format: HDTV 1080i

Ownership
- Owner: Editorial Perfil (50%); Grupo Alpha (50%)

History
- Founded: 2018; 8 years ago
- Launched: 2022; 4 years ago
- Closed: August 1, 2026; 3 months ago

Bravo TV was an Argentine commercial television network historically owned by Grupo Perfil. The network broadcast on channel 27.1 in the Perfil multiplex. It was founded in 2018, but only held test transmissions until March 2022, when the network launched. After selling half of its shares to Alpha Media in January 2026, it shut down and was replaced by a new version of Rock & Pop TV, based on the Argentine radio station of the same name.

== History ==
After broadcasting nothing but a static slide with the channel's logo on the digital terrestrial frequency since 2018, Perfil and Grupo Olmos (owner of Crónica) announced the launch of Bravo TV in December 2021 with a March 2022 launch date; the channel was presented on 7 March 2022. and launched on 14 March.

On 10 December 2024, Perfil acquired Grupo Olmos's shares in the channel, with the aim of making it similar to its main channel, Net TV. Over time, the channel's situation deteriorated; on 26 April 2025, the channel registered 0.0 rating points. In order to keep Net TV afloat, Perfil decided to find a buyer for Bravo TV, as the channel was in a dire economic situation. It was announced on 14 January 2026 that Alpha Media would acquire 50% of it; the clause stipulated the possibility of having complete ownership after one year. As of May, Rock & Pop announced its return to Argentine television with the possibility of taking over Bravo TV.

The replacement/change didn't last long, as after more than 10 days on air, it was removed from the cable operators Telecentro and Flow.

At Flow, the channel was replaced by a new channel exclusive to the cable operator, and at Telecentro, the channel was not replaced.

== Programming ==
At launch, the channel was set to offer four hours of live content, with the morning program Bravo por este día, a news bulletin at noon and an evening showbiz program, Las Bravas. The rest of the launch schedule consisted of international telenovelas: Destilando amor, El cuerpo del deseo, Lala's Spa, A Força do Querer, Avenida Brasil and Rosario Tijeras. It also aired Caso Cerrado from Telemundo.

On 17 March 2025, the amount of telenovelas was reduced as the channel would prioritize primetime opinion programs from 6pm to midnight, all live. On 2 August 2025, it started airing Ventana Universitaria, produced by Universidad Nacional de Entre Ríos.
