= HMS Bravo =

HMS Bravo may refer to:

- HMS Bravo (1794), a floating battery launched in 1794 and sold in 1803
- HMS Bravo (1917), a hired trawler in service 1917-1919
