= Silvia Bravo =

Mexican physicist

Silvia Susana Bravo Núñez
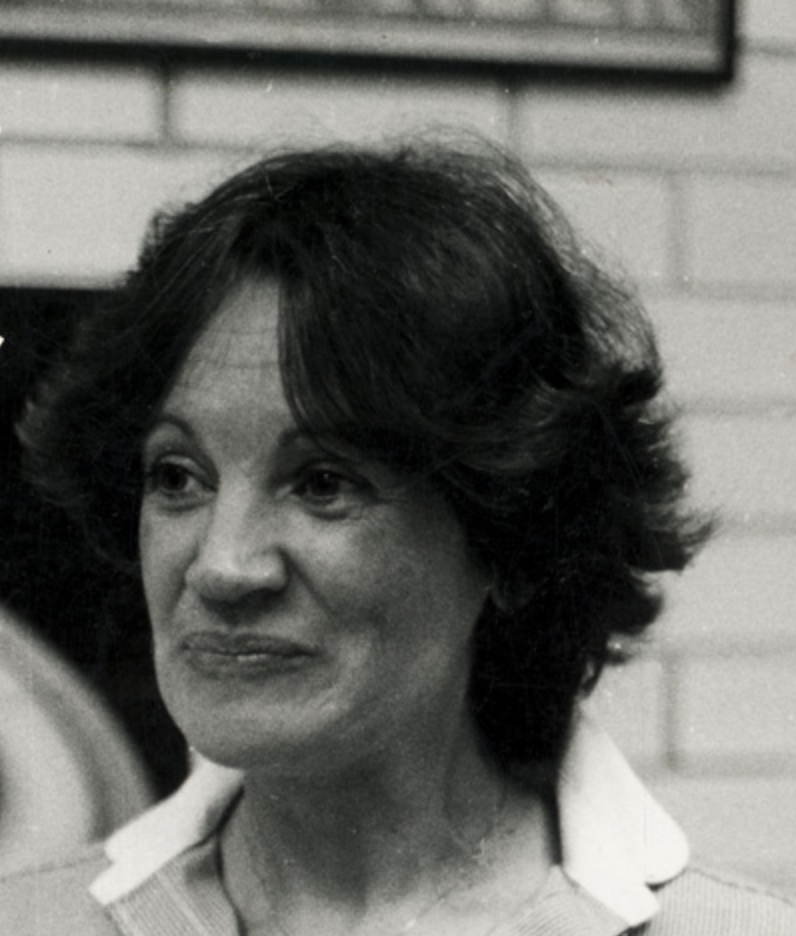
- Born: February 20, 1945; Celaya, Guanajuato, Mexico
- Died: September 8, 2000 (aged 55); Mexico City, Mexico
- Resting place: Panteón Jardín de México
- Education: Universidad Nacional Autónoma de México
- Known for: Mexican Array Radio Telescope
- Scientific career
- Fields: Solar physics, solar wind, space weather
- Workplaces: Universidad Nacional Autónoma de México

Silvia Susana Bravo Núñez (Celaya, Guanajuato 1945– Mexico City 2000) was a Mexican physicist specializing in solar physics including the study of the Sun's corona, solar wind, and the Sun's magnetic field. She was one of the pioneering researchers in the department of space sciences of the National Autonomous University of Mexico (UNAM) Institute of Geophysics.

== Education and career ==
Bravo obtained, in 1968, a degree in theoretical and experimental physics at the UNAM with the thesis La modulación de la radiación cósmica galáctica en el medio interplanetario (Modulation of galactic cosmic radiation in the interplanetary medium). In 1989 she completed a PhD at her alma mater, with a dissertation entitled Los agujeros coronales del sol como fuentes de perturbaciones a gran escala en el viento solar (The Sun's coronal holes as sources of large-scale disturbances in the solar wind), advised by Blanca Emma Mendoza Ortega. Her doctoral work was supported by research conducted at the Cavendish Laboratory in England in collaboration with the British radio astronomer and Nobel Prize winner in Physics Antony Hewish, with whom she published at least two articles.

She was a pioneer in the creation of the Space Sciences Department of the Institute of Geophysics, where she devoted herself to the study of solar physics and the configuration of the solar magnetic field. As a docent, she taught at the Faculty of Sciences, was coordinator of the Master of Science program at UNAM, and participated in the foundation of the Postgraduate Program in Earth Sciences at the Institute of Geophysics of UNAM, among other academic activities. As a science-popularizer, she participated in the edition and creation of different bulletins, wrote four books and more than 65 outreach articles.

In the early 1990s, Bravo came up with the idea of studying the solar wind and space weather by means of a radio telescope built in Mexico. In 1997, a prototype interplanetary scintillation radio telescope was completed in Teoloyucan, State of Mexico. The objectives of this prototype were to train a team of technicians with the necessary knowledge, to verify the designs and materials to be used in the final model, and to integrate a first group of students into the project. The prototype revealed the magnitude of the problem caused by electromagnetic noise, which led Dr. Bravo and her team to look for a more suitable site for the construction of the final radio telescope. In 2000, a site was secured in the municipality of Coeneo in the state of Michoacán with the necessary characteristics, i.e., a flat area surrounded by low hills, far from major sources of electromagnetic noise and with access for the construction and operation of the radio telescope.

Upon Bravo's death, members of her team continued the project, with support from the governments of the municipality of Coeneo and the state of Michoacán, and celebrated the laying of the first stone of the antenna on February 10, 2001. In 2005, the construction of the radio telescope, called the Interplanetary Scintillation Observatory and known in English as the Mexican Array Radio Telescope or MEXART, was completed. This radio telescope is the only one of its kind in the Americas and operates as part of a global network that monitors space weather and warns of disturbances that may affect technology on Earth.

== Bibliography ==
1987 – Encuentro con una estrella (Encounter with a star). Fondo de Cultura Económica. An introduction to the composition of the Sun and a complete summary of the knowledge of our star, from the most remote antiquity to the end of the 20th century.

1990 – Usted también es aristotélico (You too are an Aristotelian). Institute of Geophysics. National Autonomous University of Mexico. An introduction to science in general, and to physics in particular is presented through contrasting 'classical' mechanics, formulated by Newton in the 17th century, and the mechanics developed, mainly by Aristotle, in the 4th century B.C.

1991 – La ciencia. Su método y su historia (Science. Its method and history). Institute of Geophysics. National Autonomous University of Mexico. A simple description of the evolution of scientific thought and method, highlighting the role of studies on the fall of bodies and the motion of the Earth, in the Scientific Revolution of the sixteenth and seventeenth centuries.

1994 – Plasmas en todas partes (Plasma everywhere). Fondo de Cultura Económica. An introduction to the state of matter called plasma and its study over time, taking as a starting point its ubiquitous presence in the universe. The book explains how plasma was born in the Universe, its characteristics and behavior as well as how its study has changed the conception of the bodies and space that constitute the Universe.

== Recognition ==
Bravo was a member of the Mexican Academy of Sciences.

In 2014, she became one of the 31 women in the formal and natural sciences honored with a monument in the Paseo de la Mujer Mexicana in the Fundidora Park in Monterrey, Nuevo León

In 2012, the IV Silvia Bravo Colloquium was held as part of the Annual Meeting of the Mexican Geophysical Union with the objective of presenting technical papers related to solar physics, space weather and cosmic rays.

In 2020 the Institute of Geophysics inaugurated the Dr. Silvia Susana Bravo Núñez Scholarship Program to support students of physics.
