= Bravi =

Hired fighters and guards in northern Italy

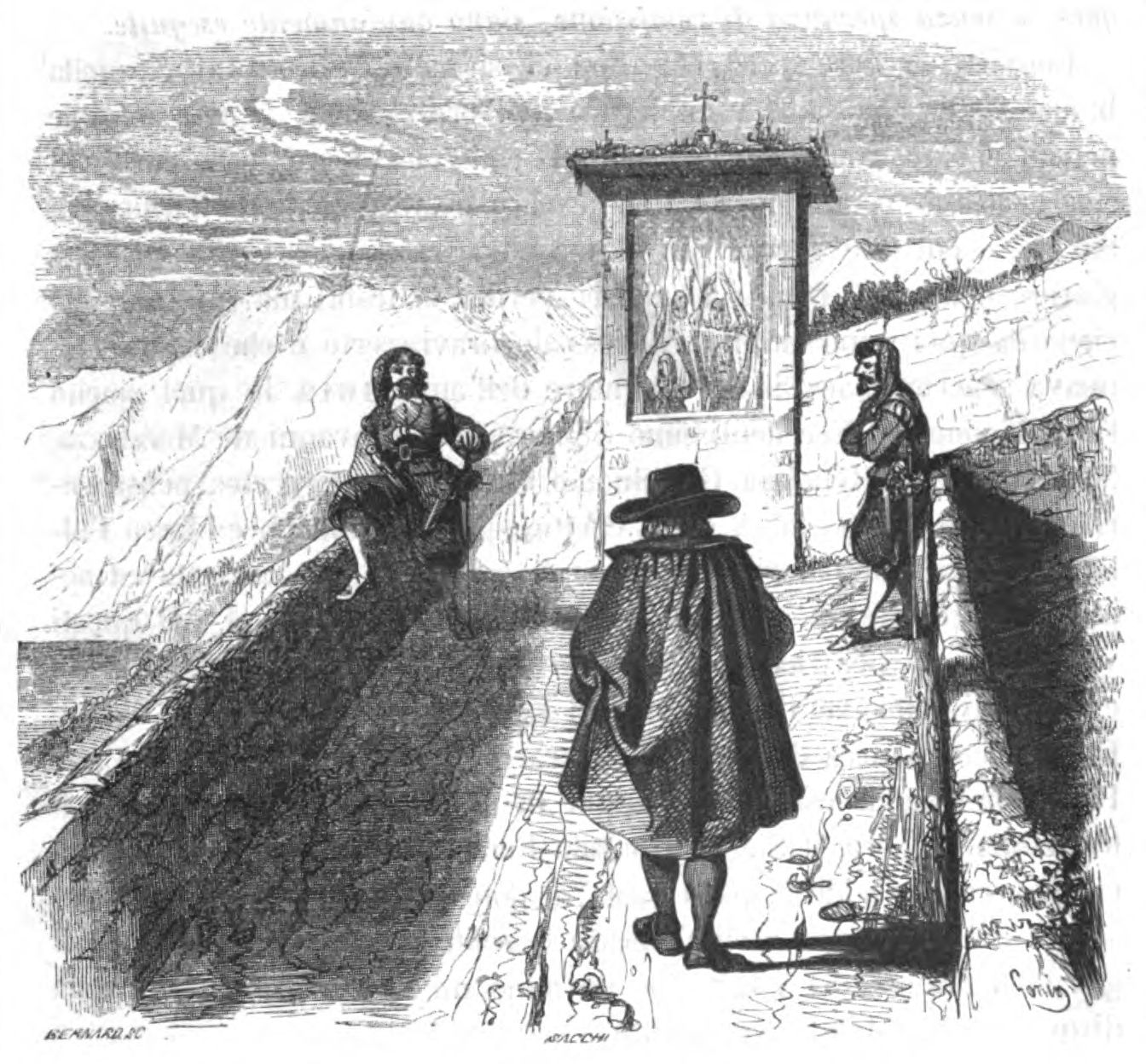
The priest don Abbondio sees at once that the thugs waiting for him are bravi. A scene from the opening of Manzoni’s I promessi sposi.

Bravi (sing. bravo; sometimes translated as 'bravoes') were hired assassins who were commonly employed throughout Italy. The word initially had no negative meaning and was applied to retainers in noble houses, or to soldiers. Their fame, and their reputation as frightening and domineering criminals, rests in part on their striking presence in Alessandro Manzoni's historical novel The Betrothed (1827), which opens with an extended description of the phenomenon.
