= Anna Bravo =

Italian social historian and feminist (1938–2019)

Anna Bravo (1938 – 8 December 2019) was an Italian social historian and feminist.

She was an associate professor of social history at the University of Turin, and a member of the Italian Society of Female Historians. She listed her research interests as holocaust and genocide Studies, cosmology (anthropology), and philology.

She was associated with the Alexander Langer Foundation, as a member of its Scientific Board of the Institute for the study of the Resistance Movement and of Contemporary Society.

== Selected publications ==
- Bravo, Anna; Bruzzone, Anna Maria (1995). In guerra senza armi : storie di donne, 1940-1945. Laterza. ISBN 8842061174.
- Intervista a Primo Levi, ex deportato / a cura di Anna Bravo e Federico Cereja. Einaudi. 2011. ISBN 9788806204976.
- A_Bravo_Noi e la violenza, trent’anni per pensarci [Genesis 2004]
