= Chris Bravacos =

American political consultant

Christopher Bravacos
- Education: American University
- Known for: Bravo Group

Christopher Bravacos is an American communications consultant and lobbyist in Pennsylvania. He is the president and CEO of Bravo Group, a communications and lobbying firm.

== Career ==
He began his career as a press office intern for Congressman Jack Kemp in Washington, D.C., then worked as a congressional aide for Rep. Clarence E. Miller (Ohio) and Rep. Richard T. Schulze (Pa.).

He worked as executive director of the Republican State Committee of Pennsylvania 1992 to 1994. He then worked as Deputy Secretary for Legislative Affairs for Pennsylvania Governor Tom Ridge for 4 years. He founded his own communications and lobbying firm, Bravo Group, in 1999.

Twenty years later, with offices in Harrisburg, Philadelphia, Pittsburgh and Washington, D.C., Bravo Group is ranked by O’Dwyer’s as Pennsylvania’s largest independent public relations firm by revenue and 30th in the U.S. It is ranked 100th globally by PRWeek.

Bravacos also is a member of the Dean’s Council for the School of Communications at American University and is the chair of Excellent Schools PA, a statewide education reform advocacy organization.

He was named to the PoliticsPA list of "Pennsylvania's Smartest Staffers and Operatives," where he was described as "one of the sharpest minds for politics and business." He was named to the Pennsylvania Report "PA Report 100" list of politically influential people in Pennsylvania, where he was described as a "mainstay among the lobbying community in Harrisburg." In 2010, Politics Magazine named him one of the most influential Republicans in Pennsylvania, calling his consulting firm a "consistent top performer."
