= Château de Lupfen-Schwendi =

Castle in Haut-Rhin, Alsace, France

Coordinates: 48.1372°N 7.2865°E

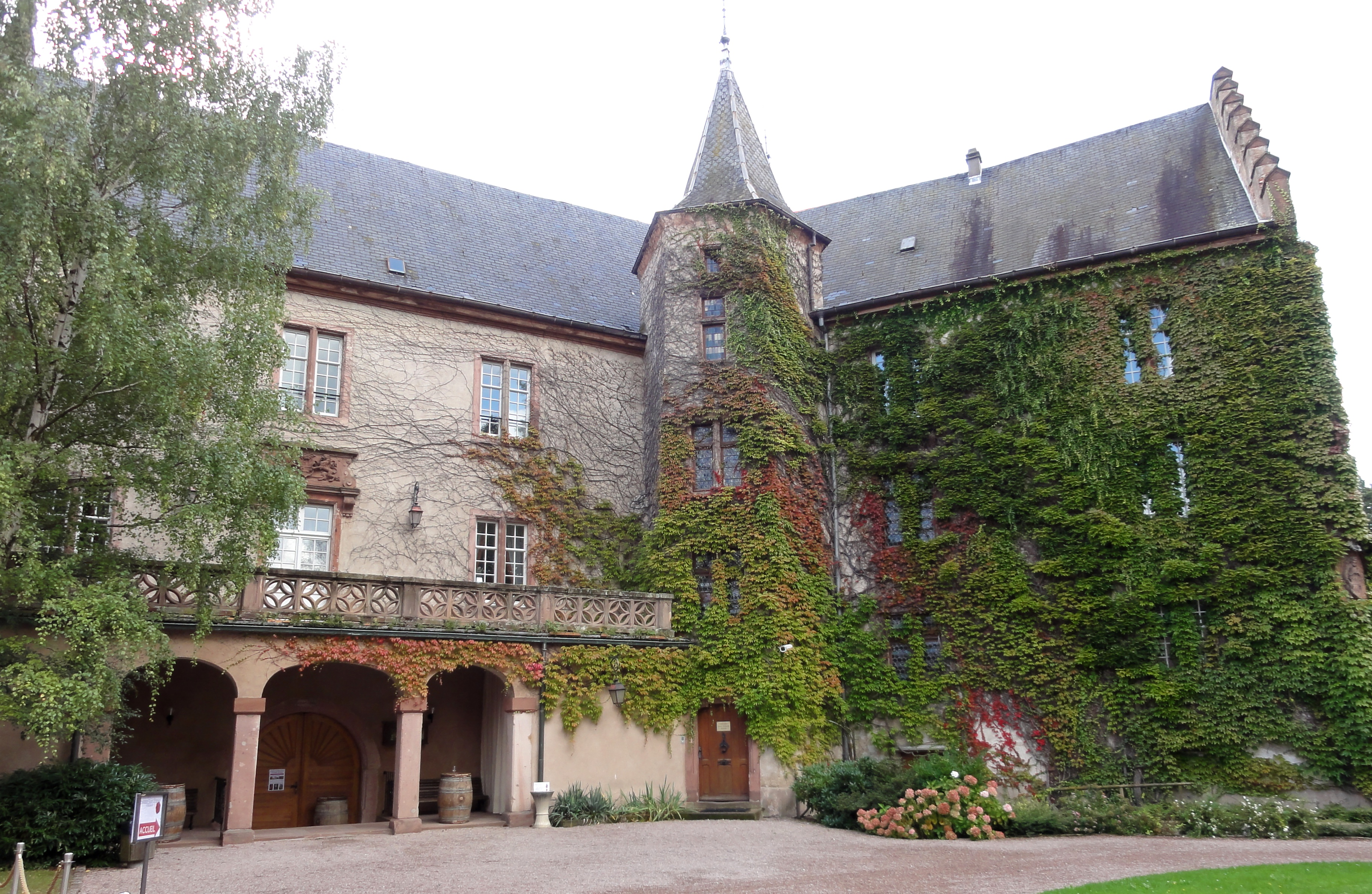

Château de Lupfen-Schwendi is a castle in the former commune of Kientzheim (now Kaysersberg Vignoble), in the department of Haut-Rhin, Alsace, France. It has been listed since 1994 as a monument historique by the French Ministry of Culture.

The castle was originally built by Jean I de Lupfen, Prince-Bishop of Constance, one of the counts of Lupfen, known in German as Johann von Lupfen, some time before his death in 1536. Ownership passed to Lazarus von Schwendi, who also owned Château du Hohlandsbourg, who rebuilt part of the castle and extended it.

Since 1972, the castle has been owned by la Confrérie Saint-Etienne, a local gastronomic society, which has housed a museum dedicated to wine in one of the buildings since 1980.

== See also ==
- List of castles in France
