= Château de Reichenstein =

Château de Reichenstein may refer to:

- Château de Reichenstein (Kientzheim)
- Château de Reichenstein (Riquewihr)
