= Kaysersberg Vignoble =

Commune in Grand Est, France

- Commune
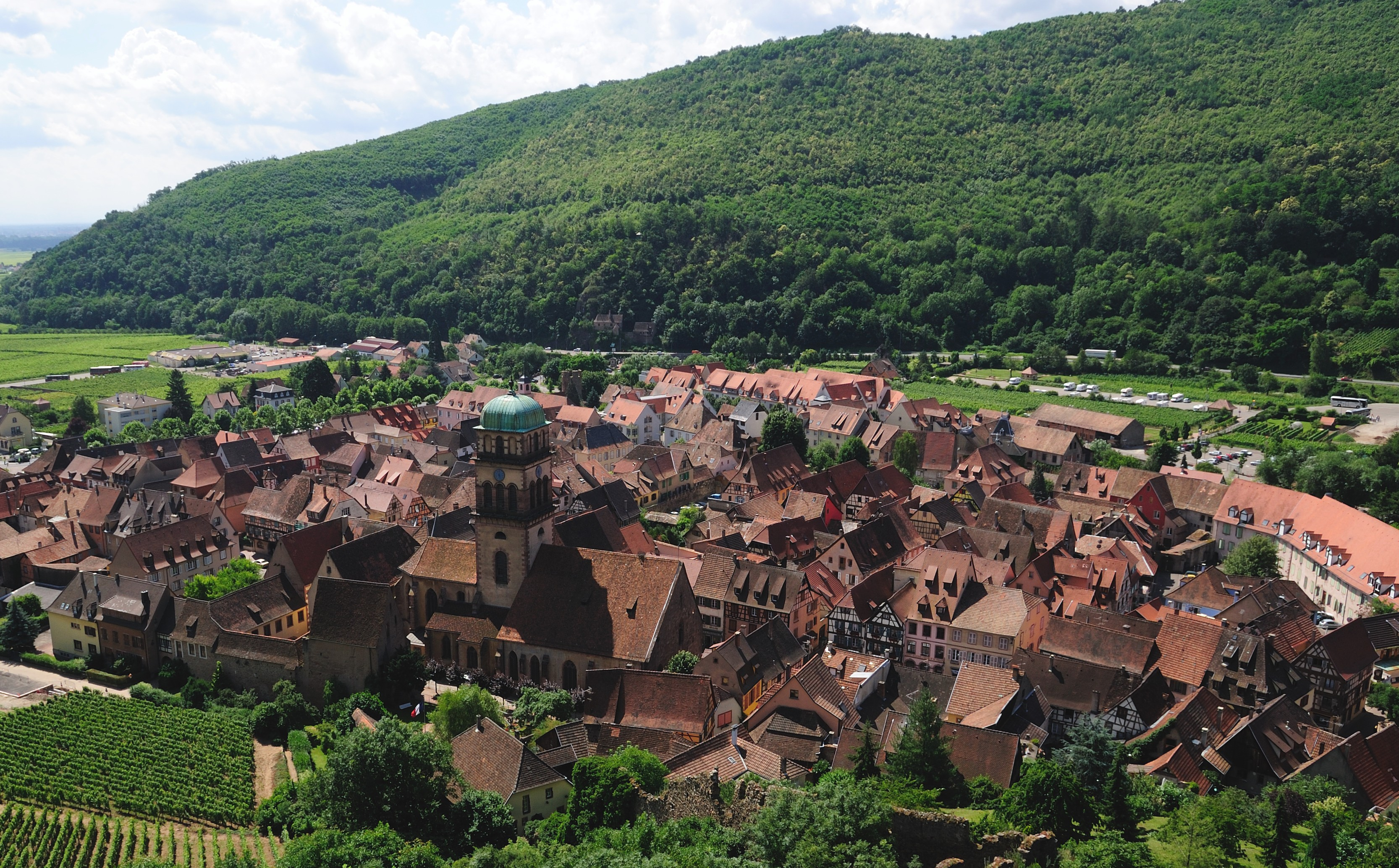
- A general view of Kaysersberg
- Location of Kaysersberg Vignoble
- Location within France Location within Grand Est
- Coordinates: 48°08′20″N 7°15′50″E
- Country: France
- Region: Grand Est
- Department: Haut-Rhin
- Arrondissement: Colmar-Ribeauvillé
- Canton: Sainte-Marie-aux-Mines
- Intercommunality: Vallée de Kaysersberg

Government
  - Mayor (2020–2026): Martine Schwartz
- Area^{1}: 35.45 km^{2} (13.69 sq mi)
- Population (2023): 4,383
  - Density: 123.6/km^{2} (320.2/sq mi)
- Time zone: UTC+01:00 (CET)
  - Summer (DST): UTC+02:00 (CEST)
- INSEE/Postal code: 68162 /68240
- ^{1} French Land Register data, which excludes lakes, ponds, glaciers > 1 km^{2} (0.386 sq mi or 247 acres) and river estuaries.

Kaysersberg Vignoble (French pronunciation: [kajzœʁsbɛʁɡ viɲɔbl]) is a commune in the Haut-Rhin department of northeastern France. The municipality was established on 1 January 2016 and consists of the former communes of Kaysersberg, Kientzheim and Sigolsheim. Kaysersberg Vignoble lies in the canton of Sainte-Marie-aux-Mines, within the arrondissement of Colmar-Ribeauvillé.

== Population ==
Population data refer to the area corresponding with the commune as of January 2025.

Historical population
Year	Pop.	±% p.a.
1968	4,775	—
1975	4,752	−0.07%
1982	4,464	−0.89%
1990	4,619	+0.43%
1999	4,489	−0.32%
2007	4,718	+0.62%
2012	4,617	−0.43%
2017	4,523	−0.41%
2023	4,383	−0.52%
Source: INSEE

== Education ==
Schools in the commune include:

- Collège Albert Schweitzer (junior high school located in Kaysersberg)
- École maternelle Bristel (nursery school located in Kaysersberg)
- École maternelle Alspach (nursery school located in Kaysersberg)
- École maternelle et élémentaire Les Crecelles (nursery and primary school located in Kientzheim)
- École maternelle et élémentaire Les Hirondelles (nursery and primary school located in Sigolsheim)
- Groupe Scolaire Jean Geiler (nursery and primary school located in Kaysersberg)

The Lycée Seijo, was a Japanese boarding school, which operated in Kientzheim from 1986 to 2005. The European Centre for Japanese Studies in Alsace (French: Centre européen d'études japonaises, CEEJA, Japanese: アルザス・欧州日本学研究所 Aruzasu Ōshū Nihongaku Kenkyūsho) is now located on the site of the former school.

== Tourism ==
As the name suggests the commune is surrounded by vineyards where Alsace wine of excellent quality is produced. The commune lies on the Route des Vins d'Alsace.

There are a number of castles which are all within walking distance of each other: the ruin of Kaysersberg Castle in Kaysersberg, Chateau des Ifs, Château de Lupfen-Schwendi and Château de Reichenstein in Kientzheim. The ruin of Château du Wineck in Katzenthal is also within walking distance.

== Notable people ==
- Anthony Bourdain, celebrity chef, author, and travel documentarian, died here of suicide while filming a TV show
- Johann Geiler von Kaisersberg (known locally as Jean Geiler), priest and theologian, was raised in Kaysersberg
- Roger Hassenforder, former cyclist who operated a restaurant in Kaysersberg
- Anthony Kohlmann, Jesuit priest known for his role in the formation of the Diocese of New York, was born in Kaysersberg
- Blessed Anicet Kopliński (born Anicet Adalbert Koplin), German priest who worked mostly in Poland, became a Capuchin friar (Père Anicet) in Sigolsheim. One of the 108 Martyrs of World War II.
- Andreas Räss, bishop of Strasbourg, was born in Sigolsheim
- Albert Schweitzer, theologian, musician, philosopher, and physician, was born in Kaysersberg
- Lazarus von Schwendi, Austrian military commander, lived in Kientzheim
- Hervé This, inventor of molecular gastronomy, president of l'Association des Amis des Orgues Valentin Rinkenbach de Kientzheim
- Matthäus Zell, Lutheran pastor, was born in Kaysersberg

== See also ==
- Communes of the Haut-Rhin department
