= Wicket gate =

Pedestrian door or gate

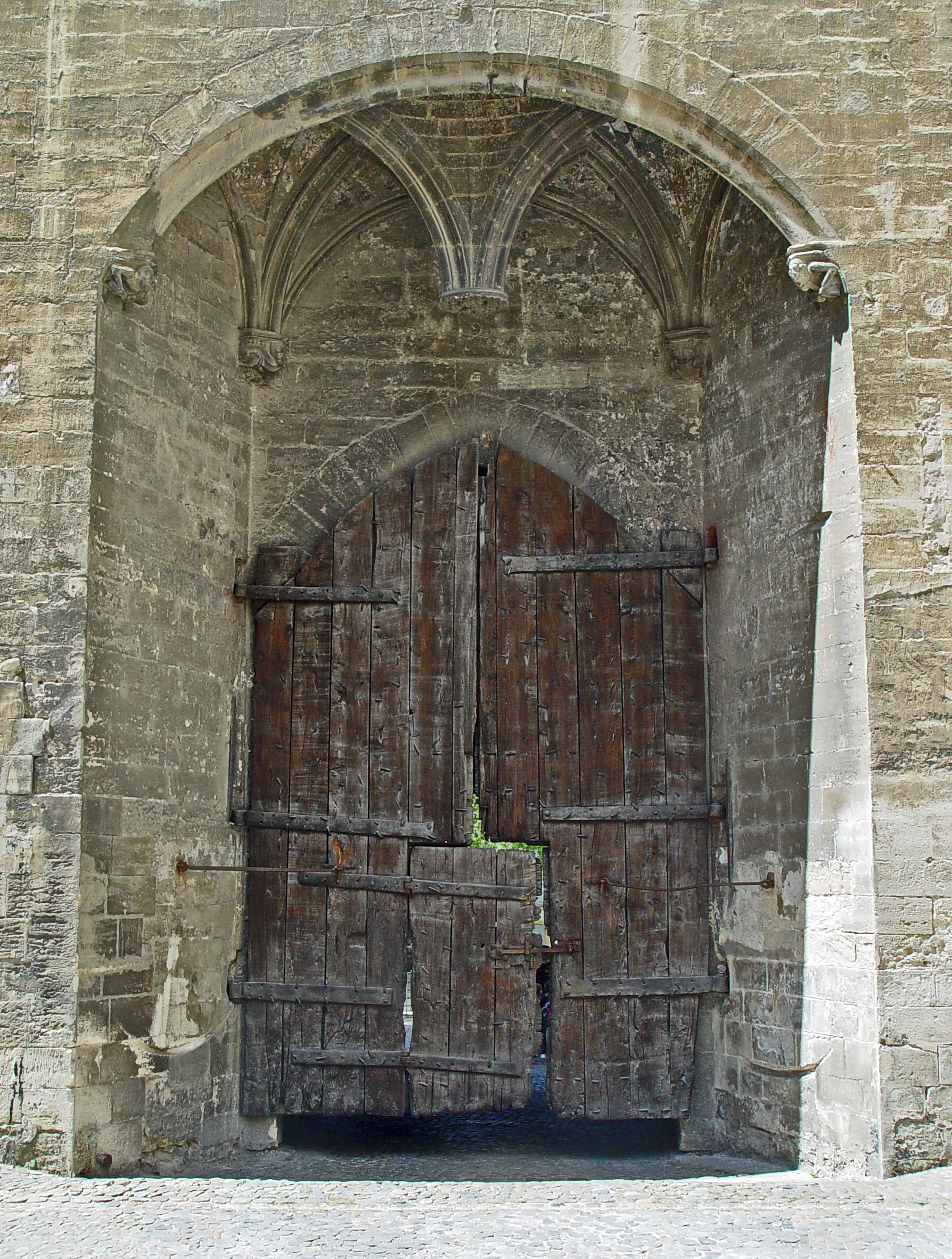
A wicket gate in the Palais des Papes (Avignon).

A wicket gate, or simply a wicket, is a pedestrian door or gate, particularly one built into a larger door or into a wall or fence.

== Use in fortifications ==
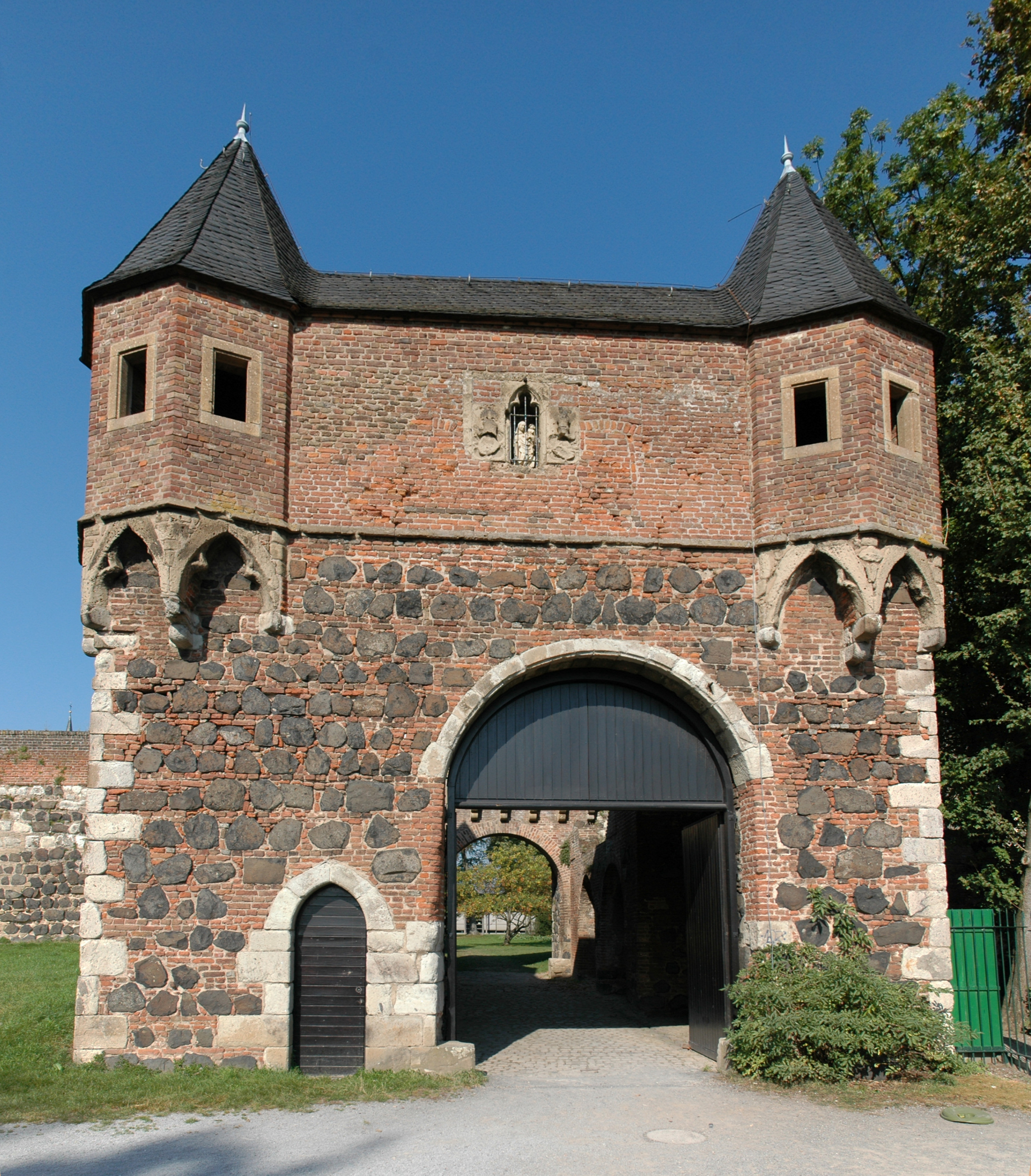
South gate of Friedestrom Castle with its wicket (pedestrian entrance)

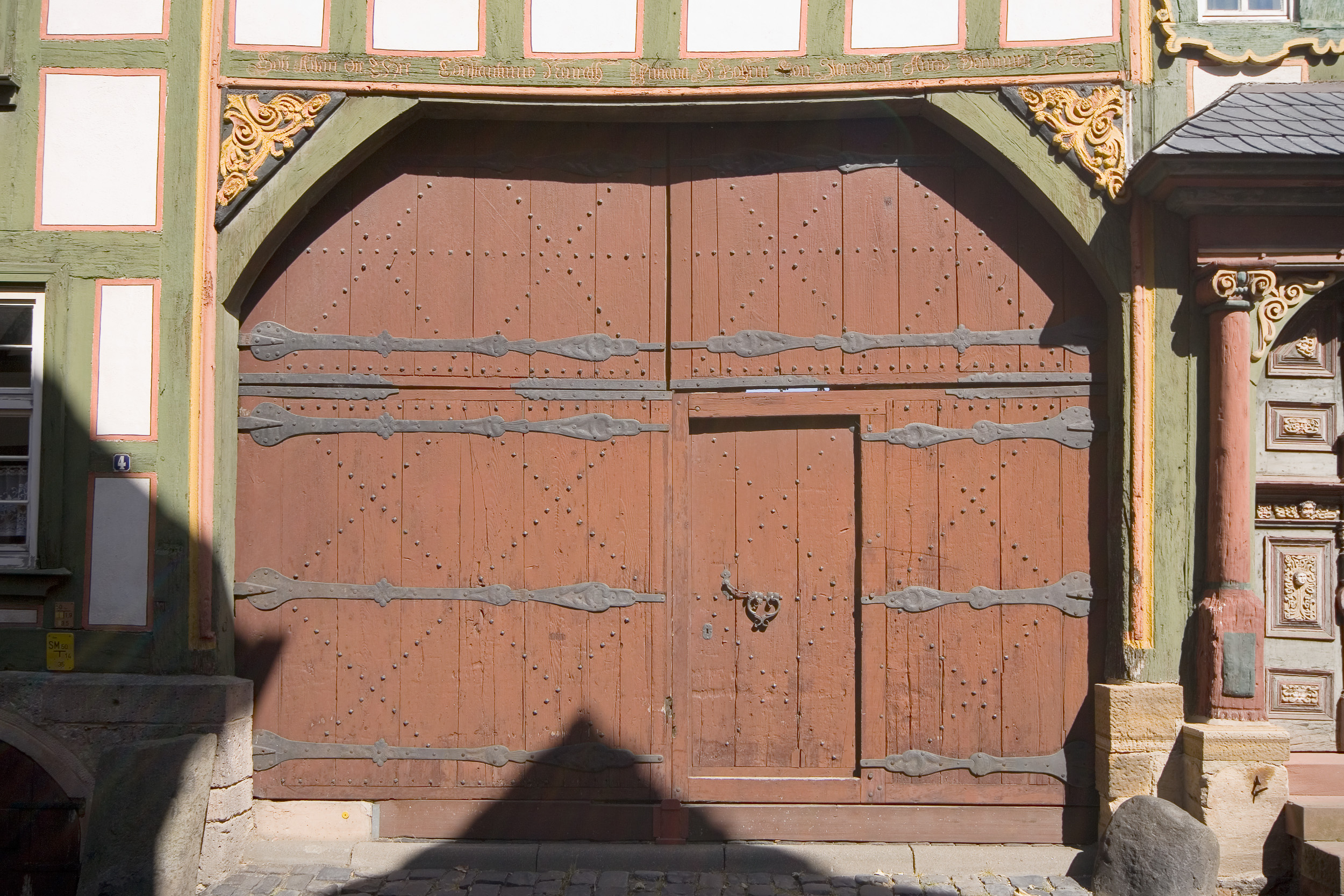
Gate and wicket (manway) of Alsfeld's New Town Hall

Wickets are typically small, narrow doors either alongside or within a larger castle or city gate. The latter were often double gates, large and heavy, designed to allow the passage of wagons, coaches and horsemen. The purpose of wickets was to avoid the risk of having to open the main gates to the castle or city for just one or two individuals on foot. Because the wicket was only one person wide, it allowed entry only one at a time and enabled the guards to control access better. In the Middle Ages the narrow doors in the city walls also enabled late arrivals to gain entry after the main gates had been closed.

If the small entrance in the door of a large gate has a high threshold, it may be called a manway. If it is a separate, narrow entrance next to the main gate, it may be called a pedestrian entrance. This type of double entrance is rather uncommon, however, and was only worth having at large sites where there was a lot of coming and going. It is found, for example, at the Alsatian castle of Hohlandsbourg, the Hochburg in Emmendingen, the Electoral Cologne castle of Friedestrom and at Schaunberg Castle in Austria. The narrow side entrance could be protected by its own drawbridge and sometimes even opened into a gate passage separated from the main one as, for example, at Hohenwang Castle.

The wickets in main gates that were easily visible should not be confused with the small, hidden sally ports in the walls of castles and fortifications. These small openings were used in times of siege to escape or carry out military raids.

== Other uses ==
A wicket gate is also used for a stand-alone gate that provides convenient secondary access, for example to the rear of a walled park or garden. The cricket term "wicket" comes from this usage.

"The Wicket Gate" is an important feature in John Bunyan's 17th-century Christian allegory The Pilgrim's Progress. As the first stage of the journey of Christian to the Celestial City, it is the entrance to the King's Highway, Bunyan's idea being to illustrate Jesus's dictum, "Enter by the narrow gate. For the gate is wide and the way is easy that leads to destruction, and those who enter by it are many. For the gate is narrow and the way is hard that leads to life, and those who find it are few." (Matthew 7:13–14).

== See also ==
- Lock (water transport)
- Penstock
- Sally port
- Stile
- Turnstile

== Literature ==
- Friedrich-Wilhelm Krahe: Burgen des deutschen Mittelalters. Grundrisslexikon. Flechsig, Würzburg, 2000, ISBN 3-88189-360-1, p. 24.
- Friedrich-Wilhelm Krahe: Burgen und Wohntürme des deutschen Mittelalters. Thorbecke, Stuttgart, 2002, ISBN 3-7995-0104-5, p. 28.
- Otto Piper: Burgenkunde. Reprint of the 3rd edition of 1912. Weltbild, Augsburg 1994, ISBN 3-89350-554-7, p. 300.
