= Château de Reichenstein, Riquewihr =

Ruined castle in Haut-Rhin, Alsace, France

Coordinates: 48.1774°N 7.2813°E

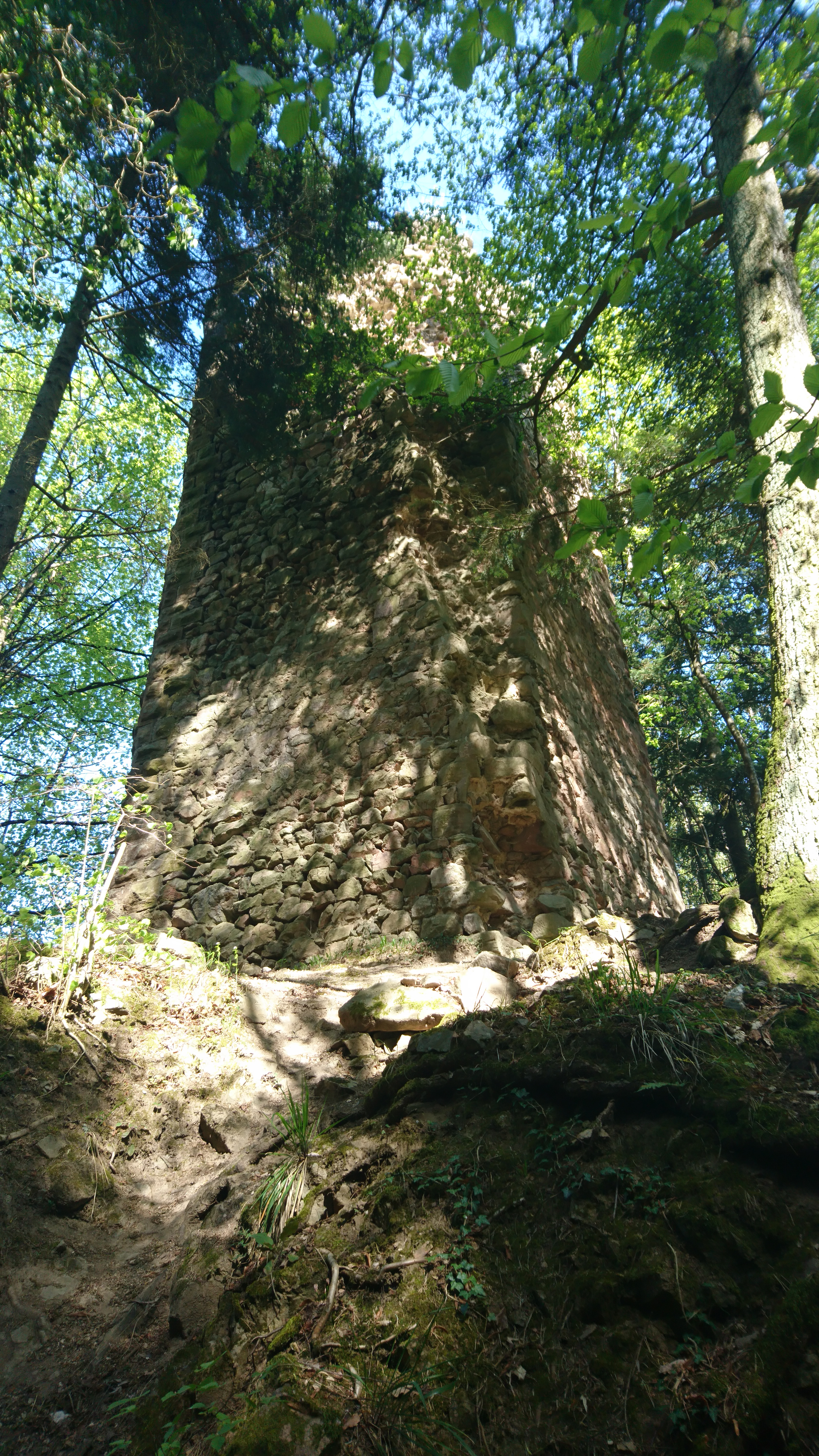
Ruins of Château de Reichenstein

Château de Reichenstein (Reichenstein Castle) is a ruined castle in the commune of Riquewihr, in the department of Haut-Rhin, Alsace, France. It has been a listed historical monument since 1990.

The ruin lies in the valley of the Sambach (a local brook). The ruin is near to Château de Bilstein, another castle ruin.

== History ==
The castle was built for the knights of Reichenstein somewhere before 1255 (when it was first mentioned). The knights of Reichenstein were a family of robber barons (Chevaliers Voleurs in French, it is argued that they were also known as Rheinstein in Germany). This castle was ruined in 1265 by the militia's of Strasbourg and Colmar on the orders of Rudolf of Habsburg, as a reprisal, supposedly because the Reichensteins interfered with the local trade. The castle was never rebuilt.

Because of their activities a similar fate befell some of their other properties, after the creation of the Hanseatic League.

== Alternate name ==
Because the tower is the most prominent part of the ruin, which is near Riquewihr, the castle is sometimes called "La Tour de Riquewihr" and marked on maps as such.

== Similar castles ==
- The castle is not to be confused with the eponymous castle in Kientzheim.
- Reichenstein Castle in Arlesheim, Switzerland.
- Reichenstein Castle in Trechtingshausen, Germany, also raised on the orders of Rudolf of Habsburg.
- Reichenstein Castle in Neckargemünd, Germany.

The family known as the Reich von Reichenstein also held Château de Landskron in France and Inzlingen Castle (also known as Schloss Reichenstein) in Germany.
