= Sigolsheim =

Part of Kaysersberg-Vignoble in Grand Est, France

- Part of Kaysersberg Vignoble
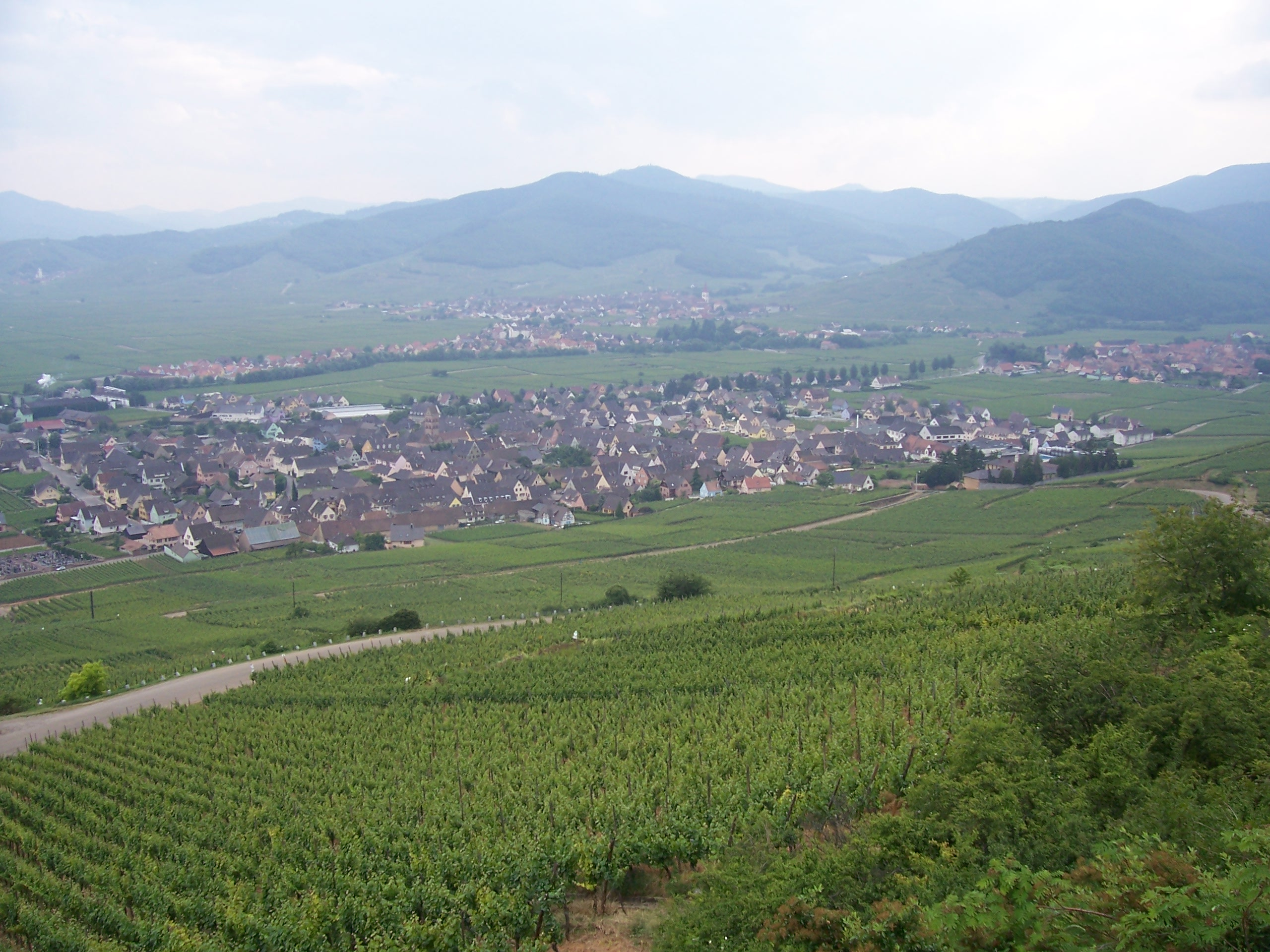

- Coat of arms
- Location of Sigolsheim
- Location within France Location within Grand Est
- Coordinates: 48°08′05″N 7°18′06″E
- Country: France
- Region: Grand Est
- Department: Haut-Rhin
- Arrondissement: Colmar-Ribeauvillé
- Canton: Sainte-Marie-aux-Mines
- Commune: Kaysersberg Vignoble
- Area^{1}: 5.8 km^{2} (2.2 sq mi)
- Elevation: 194 m (636 ft)
- Highest elevation: 401 m (1,316 ft)
- Lowest elevation: 188 m (617 ft)
- Population (2021): 1,242
  - Density: 210/km^{2} (550/sq mi)
- Time zone: UTC+01:00 (CET)
  - Summer (DST): UTC+02:00 (CEST)
- Postal code: 68240
- ^{1} French Land Register data, which excludes lakes, ponds, glaciers > 1 km^{2} (0.386 sq mi or 247 acres) and river estuaries.

Sigolsheim (French: [siɡɔlsajm] Alsatian: Sìjelse) is a former commune in the Haut-Rhin department in north-eastern France. On 1 January 2016, it was merged into the new commune Kaysersberg Vignoble.

The village has a primary school: "les Hirondelles".

== Population ==
Historical population
Year	Pop.	±% p.a.
2006	1,177	—
2011	1,201	+0.40%
2021	1,242	+0.34%
Source: INSEE

== See also ==
- Communes of the Haut-Rhin department
