= Château de Pflixbourg =

Castle in Grand Est, France

Coordinates: 48°4′2″N 7°15′16″E

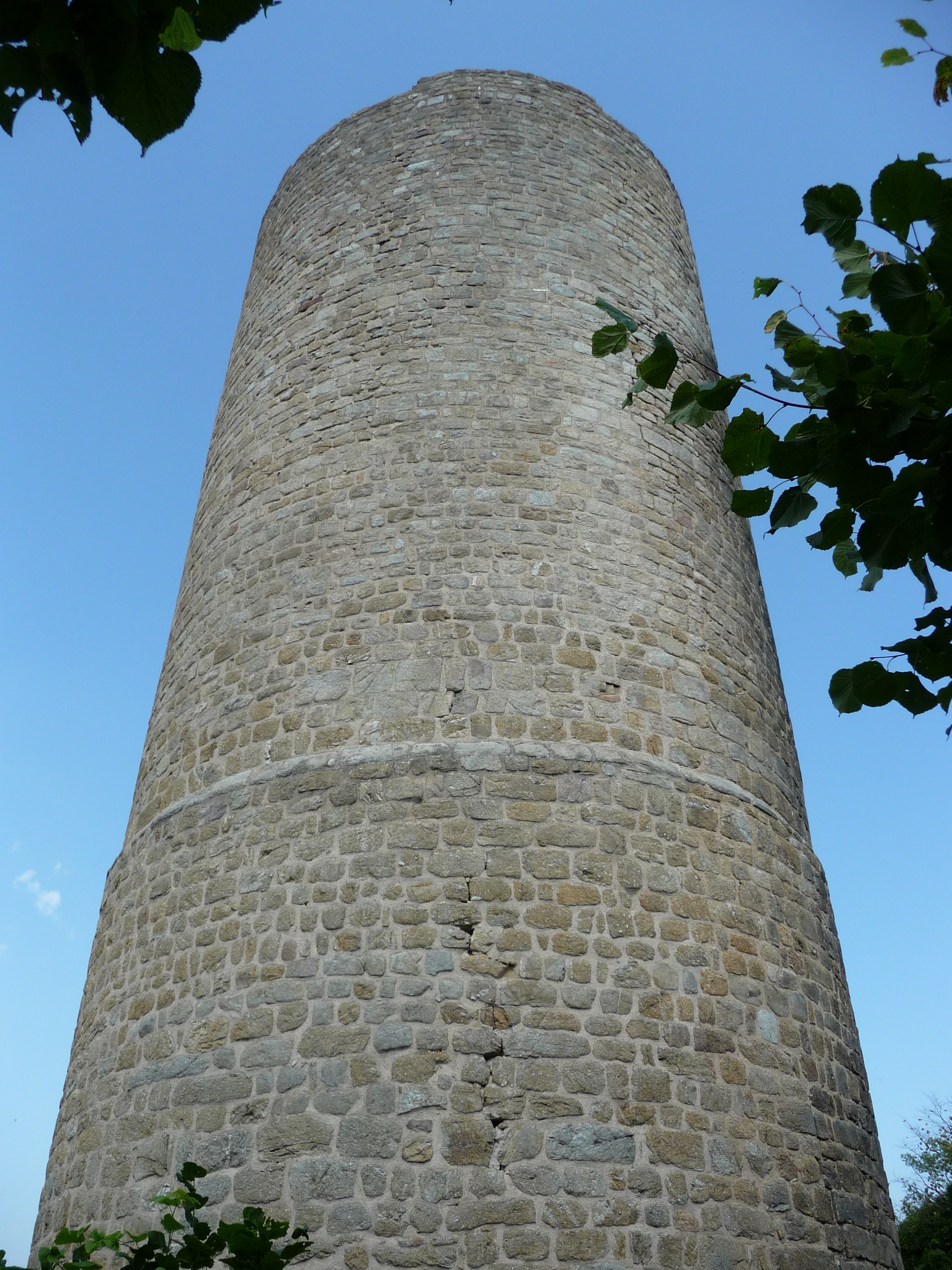
The keep of the Pflixbourg

The Château du Pflixbourg (from the German Blicksburg = “castle with a view”) is a castle in the commune of Wintzenheim, in the Haut-Rhin département of France.

The castle has been listed as a Monument historique since 1968 by the French Ministry of Culture.

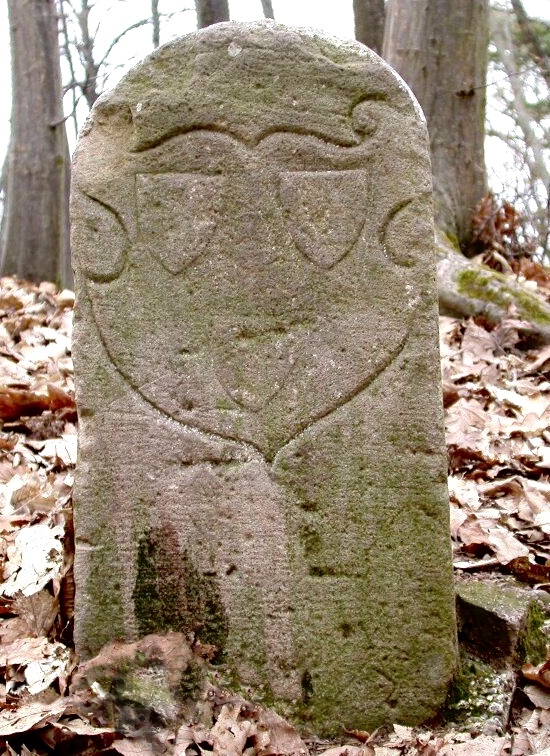
Boundary stone of Château du Pflixbourg, Alsace, Haut-Rhin

== See also ==
- List of castles in France
