= Wintzenheim =

Commune in Grand Est, France

- Commune
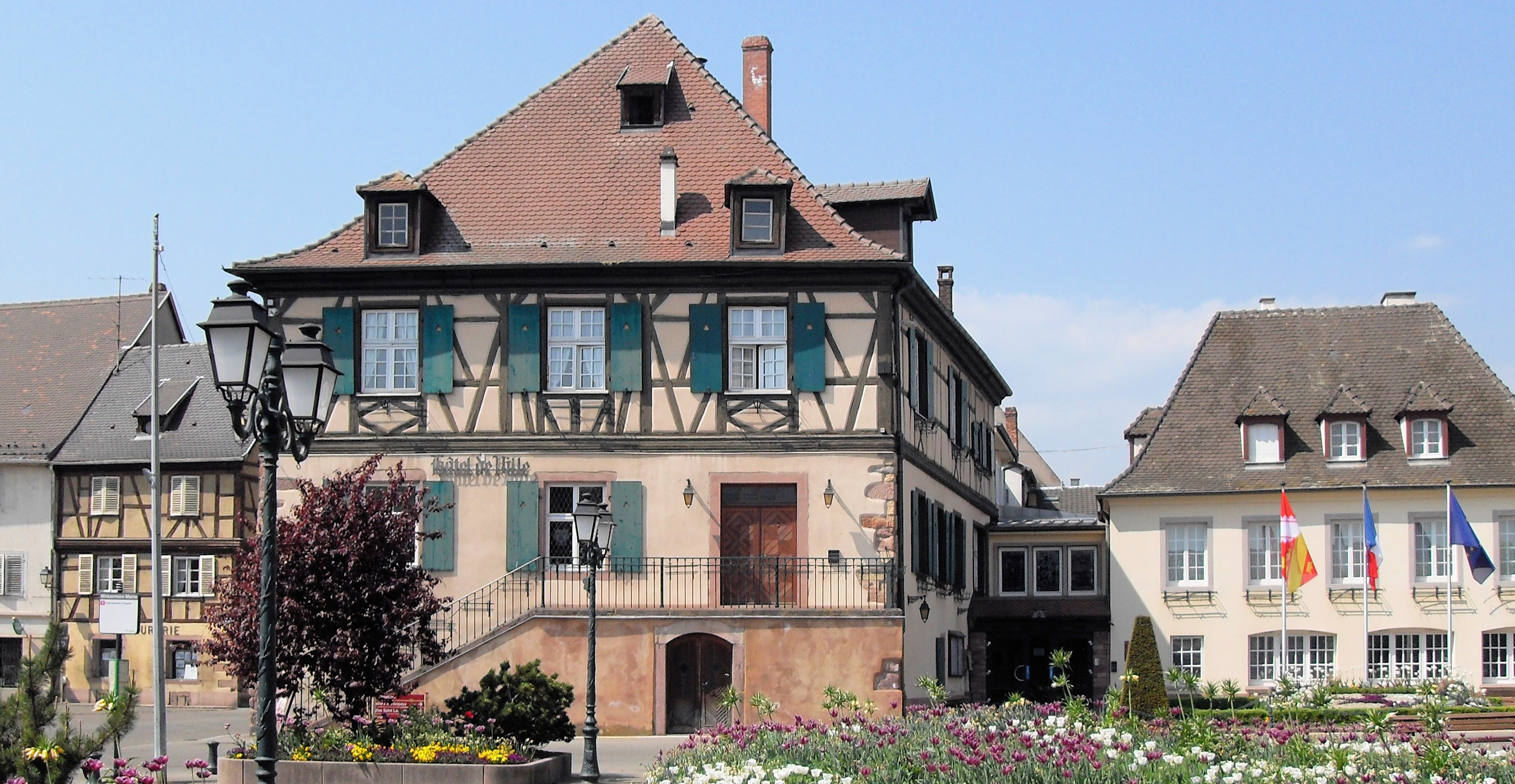
- The town hall in Wintzenheim

- Coat of arms
- Location of Wintzenheim
- Location within France Location within Grand Est
- Coordinates: 48°04′26″N 7°17′26″E
- Country: France
- Region: Grand Est
- Department: Haut-Rhin
- Arrondissement: Colmar-Ribeauvillé
- Canton: Wintzenheim
- Intercommunality: Colmar Agglomération

Government
  - Mayor (2026–32): Luca Basso
- Area^{1}: 18.97 km^{2} (7.32 sq mi)
- Elevation: 230 m (750 ft)
- Highest elevation: 827 m (2,713 ft)
- Lowest elevation: 202 m (663 ft)
- Population (2023): 8,059
  - Density: 424.8/km^{2} (1,100/sq mi)
- Time zone: UTC+01:00 (CET)
  - Summer (DST): UTC+02:00 (CEST)
- INSEE/Postal code: 68374 /68920
- ^{1} French Land Register data, which excludes lakes, ponds, glaciers > 1 km^{2} (0.386 sq mi or 247 acres) and river estuaries.

Wintzenheim (French pronunciation: [vintsənaim]; German: Winzenheim) is a commune in the Haut-Rhin département in Grand Est in north-eastern France.

== Geography ==
Wintzenheim is a town of about 8,000 inhabitants (2020) to the west of Colmar. Colmar is a town which receives very little rain because it benefits from a microclimate (called the micro-climat des Trois-Épis) due to the effect of a vortex propagated by the Munster valley with winds from the south-west to west. Situated only 3 km (1.9 mi) from Colmar, Wintzenheim benefits from this micro-climate.

== History ==
Until the French Revolution, Wintzenheim was a dependency of the Lords of Hohlandsbourg.The area was historically administered by the Ribeaupierre family. Later, control passed to the Counts of Lupfen. In the 16th century, Lazarus von Schwendi (also known as Lazare de Schwendi) took over its administration. Louvois rewarded general Joseph de Montclar with this fief in 1680.

== Population ==
Its inhabitants are called Wintzenheimois in French.

Historical population
Year	Pop.	±% p.a.
1968	6,001	—
1975	6,311	+0.72%
1982	6,441	+0.29%
1990	6,554	+0.22%
1999	7,180	+1.02%
2007	7,610	+0.73%
2012	7,592	−0.05%
2017	7,594	+0.01%
2023	8,059	+1.00%
Source: INSEE

== Twin town ==
- Möhnesee in Germany

== Sites and monuments ==
- Château du Hohlandsbourg
- Château du Pflixbourg
- Big Bench Nr 351 in Chapelle des Bois.
- La Chapelle Herzog : the sculptures of this neo-gothic chapel are listed as monuments historiques by the French Ministry of Culture.

== People ==
- Tomi Ungerer (1931–2019), illustrator best known for his erotic and political illustrations as well as children's books, stayed in Wintzenheim during his childhood. A community hall today bears his name.

== Gallery ==
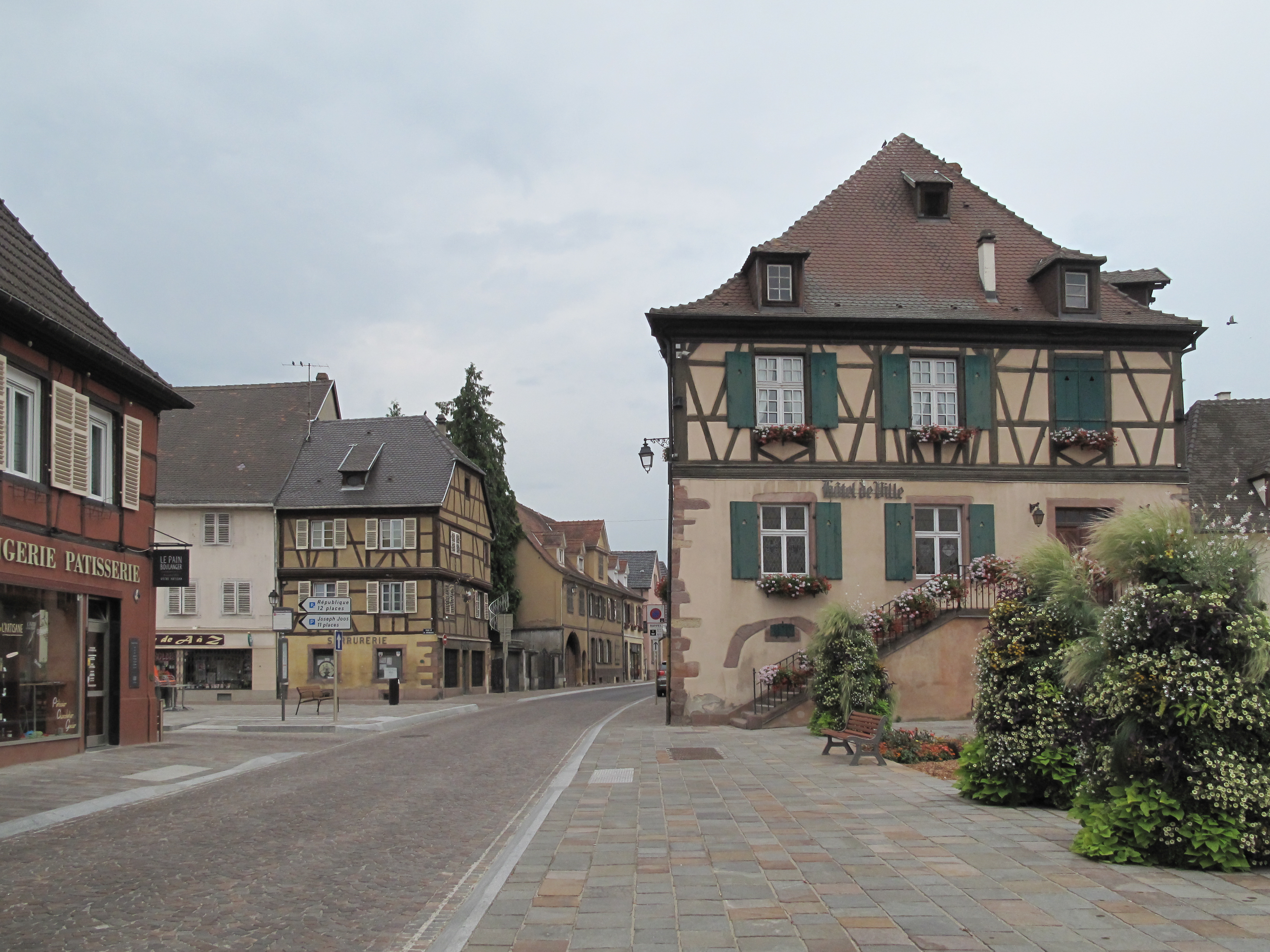
Townhall in the street

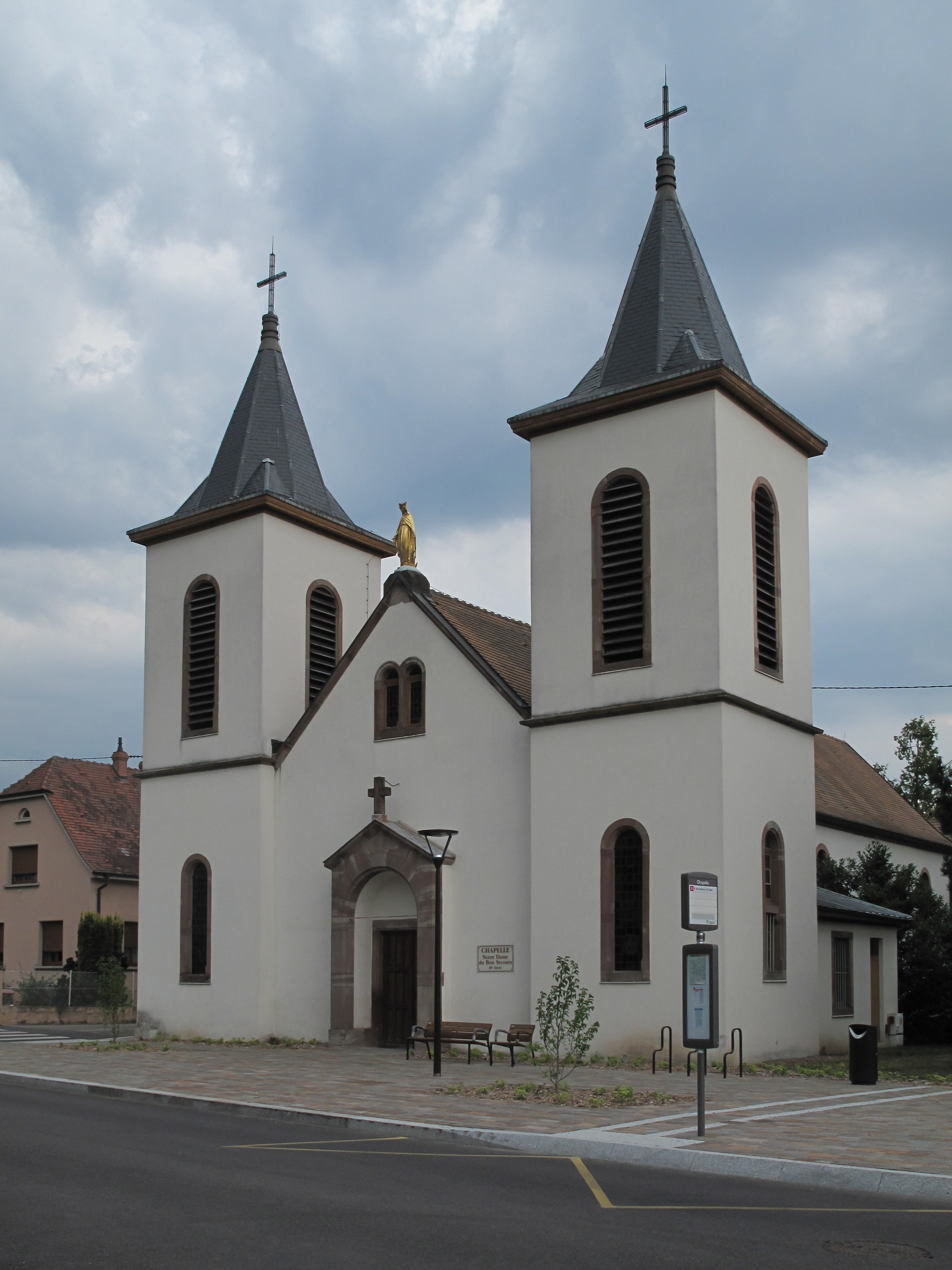
Chapel: chapelle Nôtre Dame

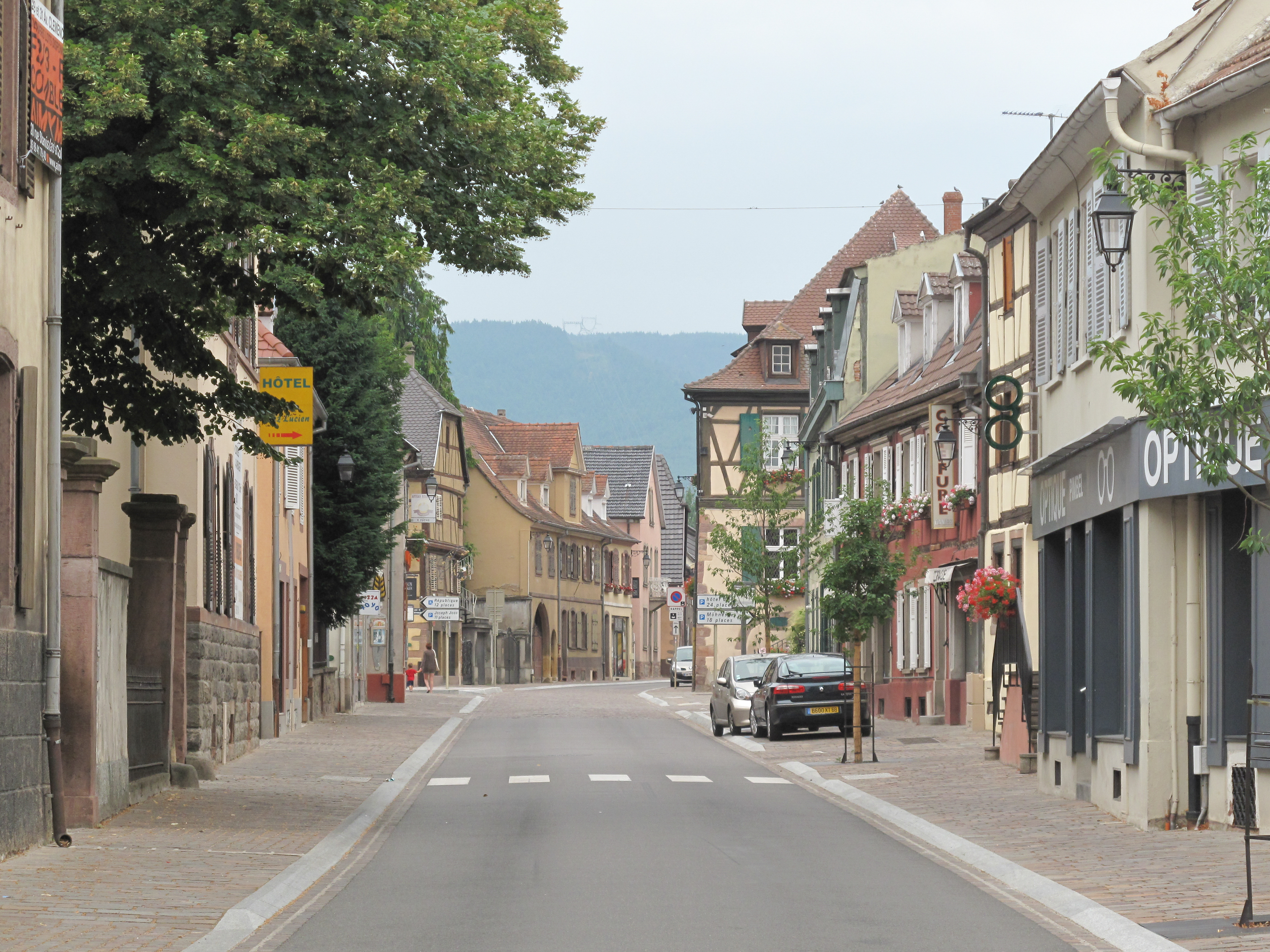
View of Rue Clemenceau

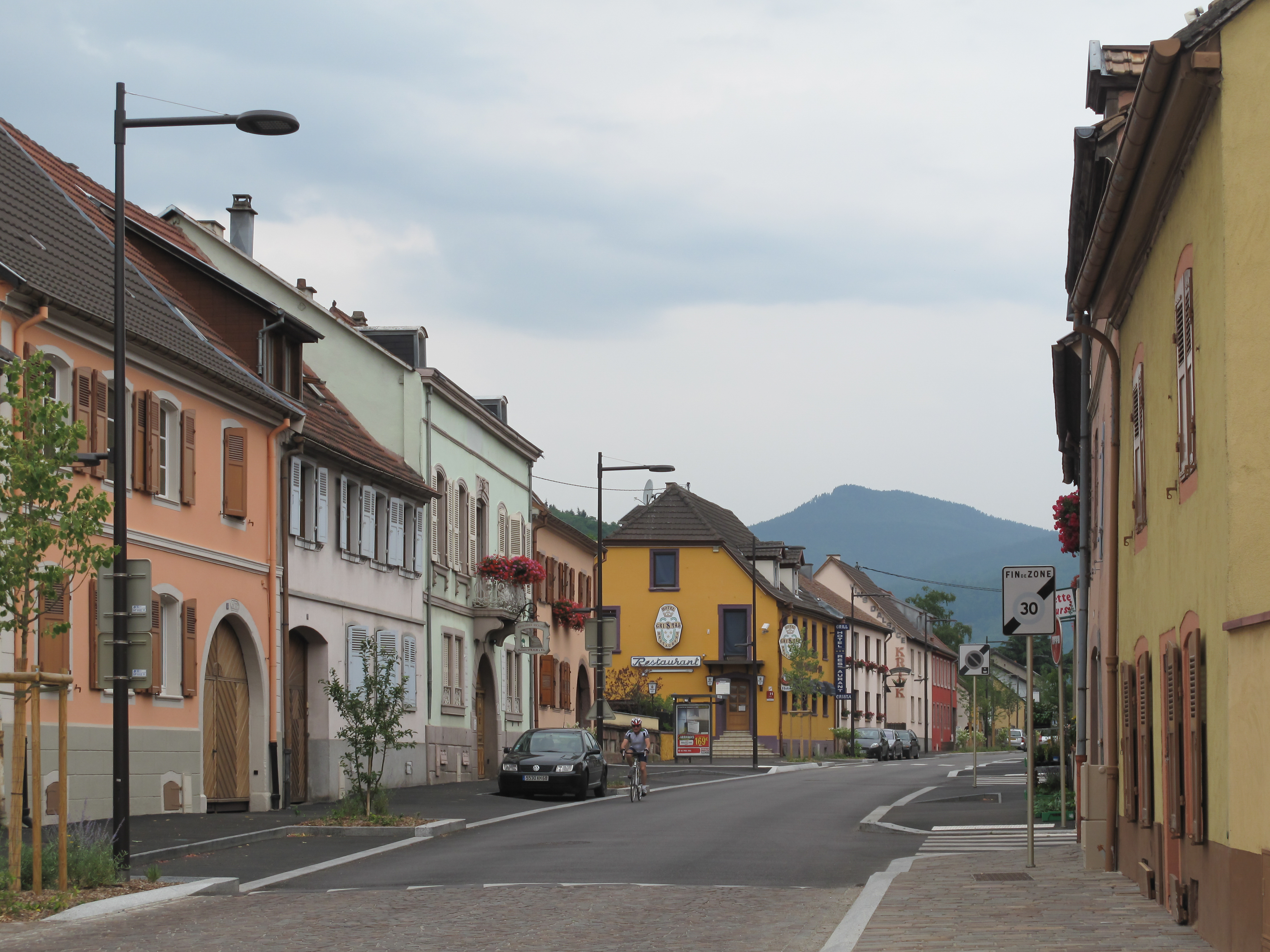
View of Rue Clemenceau

== See also ==
- Communes of the Haut-Rhin department
