= Château de Reichenstein, Kientzheim =

French château in Haut-Rhin

Coordinates: 48.1773°N 7.2803°E

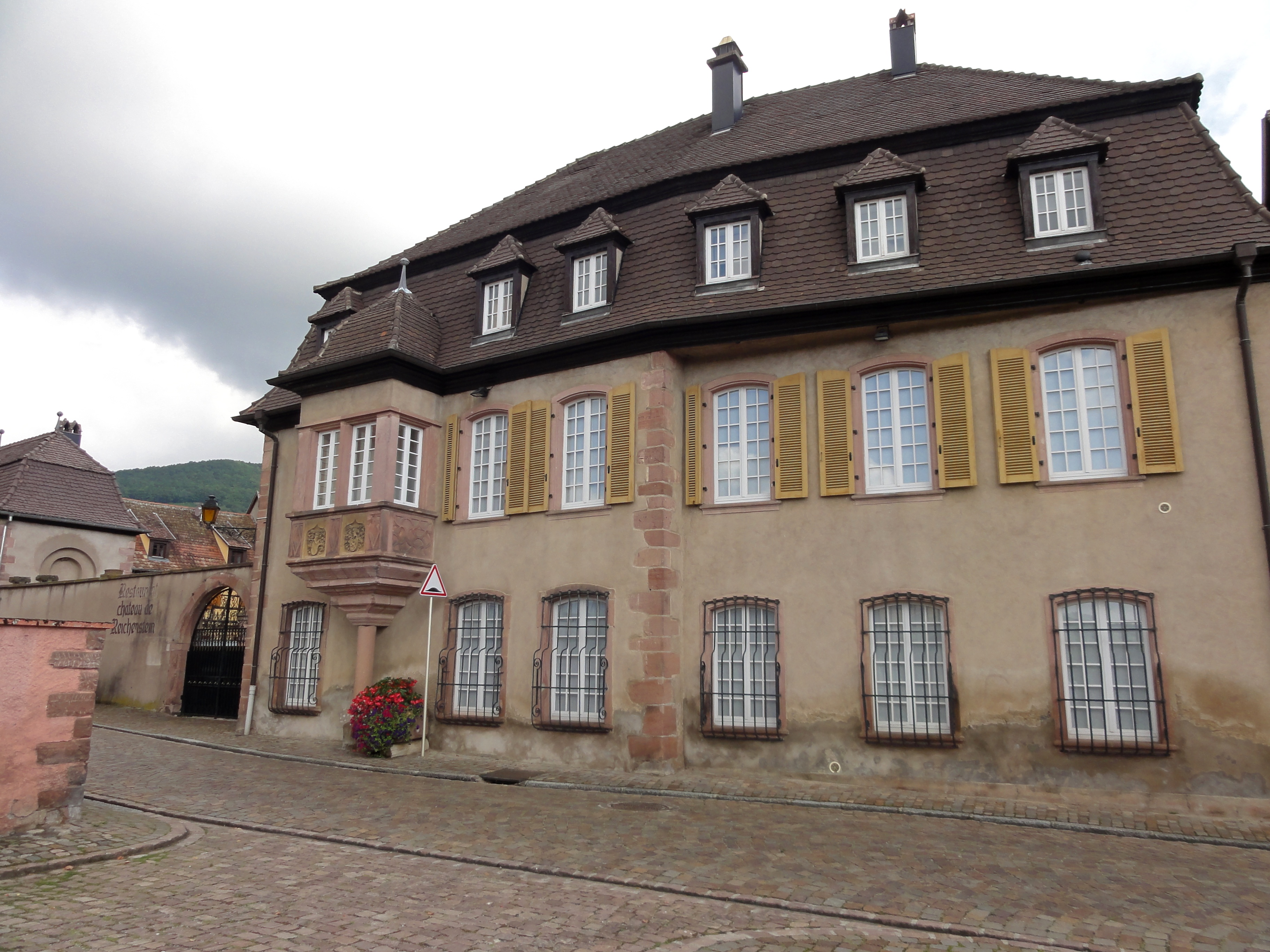
Facade of Château de Reichenstein

Château de Reichenstein is a château in the former commune of Kientzheim (now Kaysersberg Vignoble), in the department of Haut-Rhin, Alsace, France. It has been a listed historical monument since 1996.

It is not to be confused with the eponymous castle near Riquewihr.
