= Château de Bilstein =

Castle ruin in Grand Est, France

Coordinates: 48°11′44″N 7°16′12″E

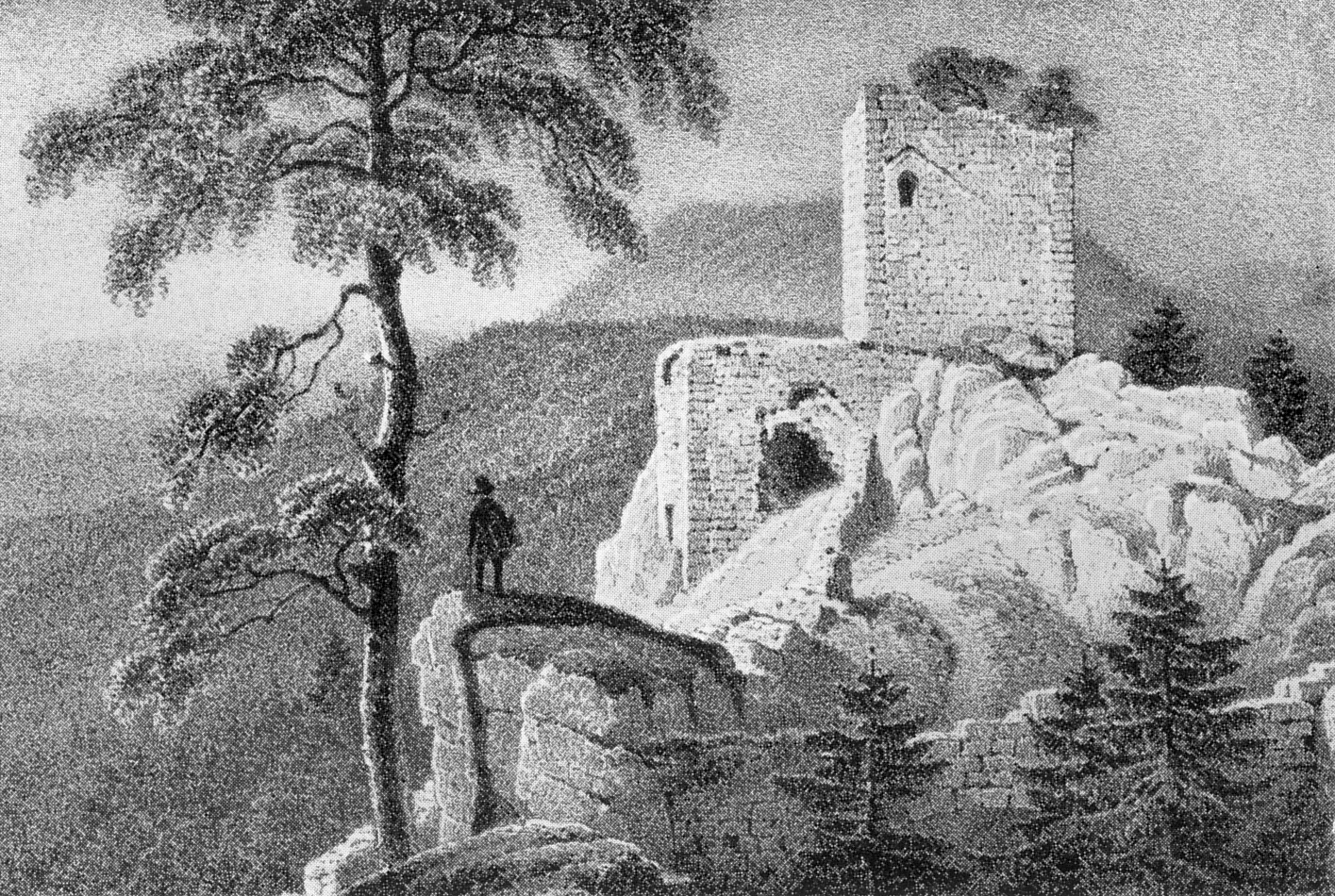
Lithograph of Château de Bilstein in 1863

The Château de Bilstein is a castle ruin in the commune of Riquewihr in the Haut-Rhin département of France.

The origin of the castle dates from the 12th century, with additional building work done in the 14th century. The castle was destroyed in 1636. It has been classified since 1898 as a monument historique by the French Ministry of Culture.

The ruin is near to that of another castle ruin, Château de Reichenstein, both popular hiking destinations. The ruin of Chateau de Bilstein lies just off GR 5.

Château de Bilstein should not be confused with another Château du Bilstein or Bildstein in Urbeis, Bas-Rhin. That château is usually referred to as Chateau du Bilstein Lorrain to avoid confusion.

== See also ==
- List of castles in France
