= Château du Wineck =

Ruined castle in Grand Est, France

Coordinates: 48.1092°N 7.2780°E

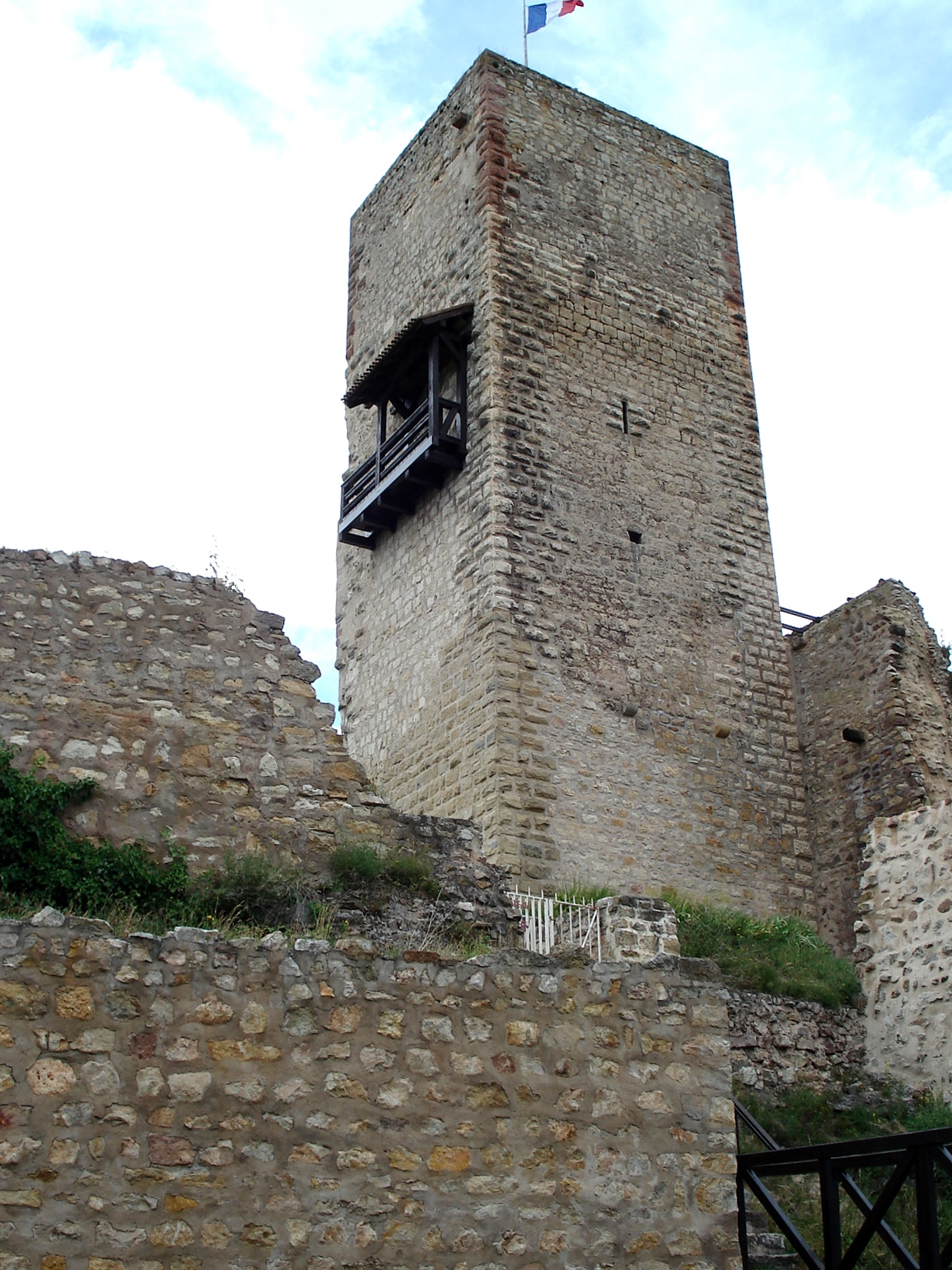
Château du Wineck

The Château du Wineck is a ruined castle in the commune of Katzenthal in the Haut-Rhin département of France. It was constructed during the 13th and 14th centuries.

== Description ==
Surrounded by vineyards, the castle stands on a granitic rocky outcrop. The keep is 20 metres high with an almost square plan (7 m by 7.5 m). A modern external staircase on the western side of the keep gives access to the first floor via a 19th-century entrance. A modern interior staircase gives access to higher levels. Originally, the second floor was entered via a high door in gothic arch off a walkway in the south wall (today, a wooden balcony) leading to the roof of the residence to the west of the keep. On the third floor, to the north, a latrine remains. In the south-eastern corner of the roof there is a gargoyle. The original parapet has been restored. The horseshoe shaped enceinte enclosed the keep from the north and parts of its round walk still exists. To the west of the keep was the residence; to the east the stables. A second enceinte opposite the castle sheltered the lower courtyard. The moat surrounding the castle was cut into rock in the north.

== Protection ==
The Société pour la Conservation des Monuments historiques en Alsace (Society for the conservation of historic monuments in Alsace) acquired the castle in 1866 and has owned it ever since. From 1972, the castle was restored by the Société pour la Restauration et la Conservation du Château de Katzenthal (Society for the Restoration and Conservation of the Château de Katzenthal). The castle was listed in 1984 as a monument historique by the French Ministry of Culture. In 1991, the surrounding enceinte was also listed.

== See also ==
- List of castles in France
