= Lazarus von Schwendi =

Austrian military commander and general

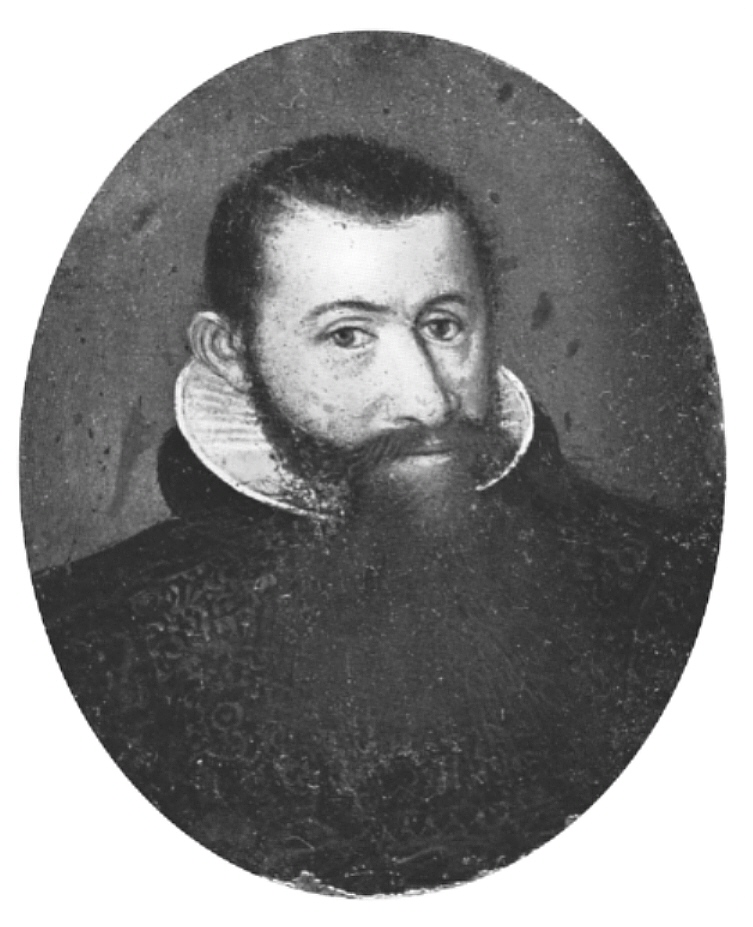
Lazarus von Schwendi

Lazarus von Schwendi, Barón de Hohenlandsberg (1522, Mittelbiberach – 28 May 1583, Ehrenkirchen) was a military commander in the Army of the Holy Roman Empire. He was important for the development of Alsatian viticulture; among his own vineyards in the region were Château de Lupfen-Schwendi and Château du Hohlandsbourg.

He was a natural son of Ruland von Schwendi (the owner of Schwendi in Swabia). He distinguished himself at the defense of Metz (1552), Battle of St. Quentin (1557), Battle of Gravelines (1558), and the siege of Tokaj in Hungary (1565).

It is claimed that von Schwendi brought a Tokay grape to Alsace from Hungary. Although it used to be called Tokay d'Alsace, it is now better known as Pinot Gris (probably to avoid confusion with the Furmint grape which is grown in the Tokaj wine region).

There is a statue of von Schwendi brandishing a vine above a fountain on la place de l'Ancienne Douane in Colmar. Designed by Frédéric Auguste Bartholdi (a native of Colmar), it was unveiled in 1898.
