= Inzlingen Castle =

Coordinates: 47°35′12″N 7°41′49″E

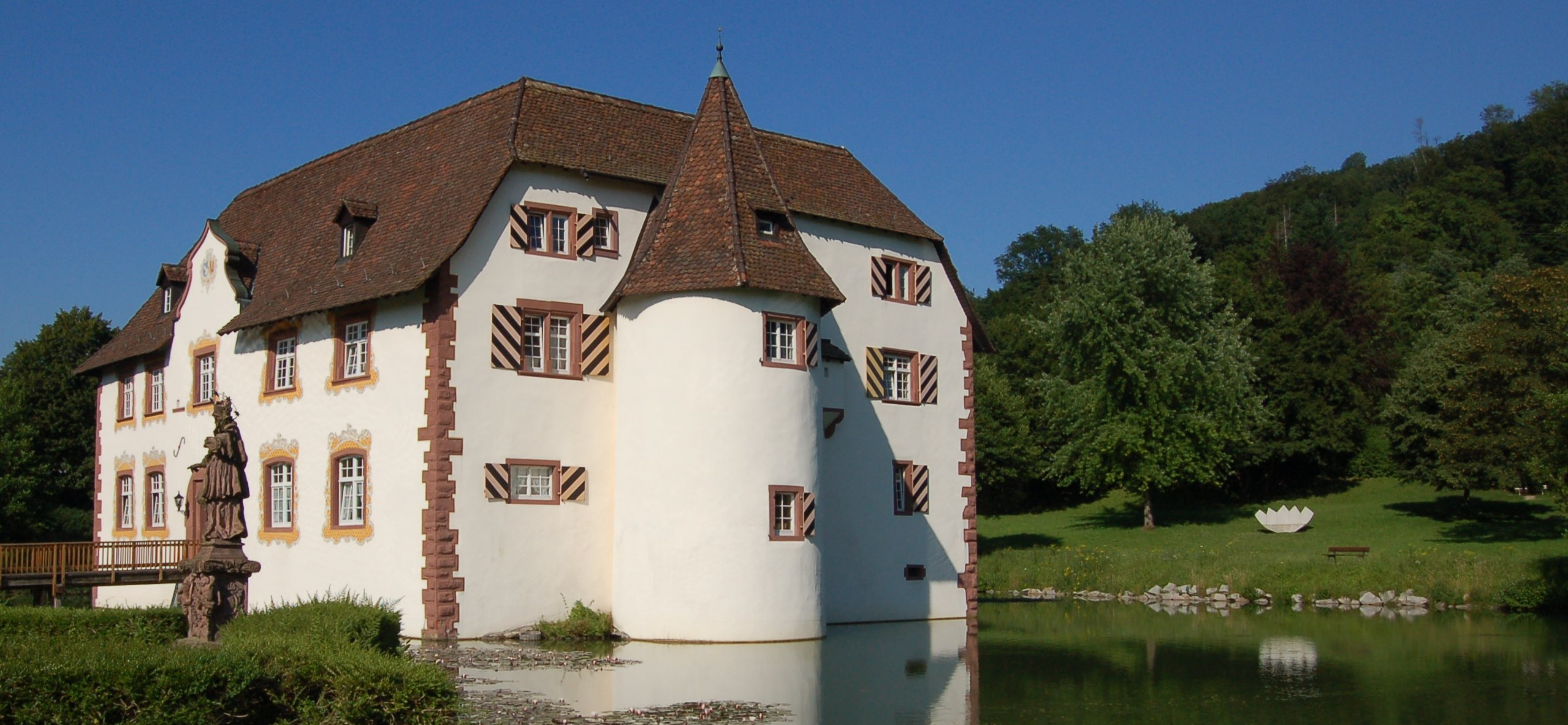

General information
- Type: Castle
- Location: Inzlingen, Germany

Inzlingen Castle (German: Wasserchloss Inzlingen), also Reichenstein Castle (Schloss Reichenstein) is a medieval castle surrounded by a moat situated in the village of Inzlingen. Inzlingen is located in the district of Lörrach, Baden-Württemberg, in the very south-west of Germany just at the Swiss border line near Basel. The origins of the castle cannot be clearly dated. The first written evidence dated 1511 – at this time already a possession of a relative of the barons Reich von Reichenstein. This noble family hold fiefdoms from the Prince-Bishopric of Basel, the Margraviate of Baden and the House of Habsburg. A Prince-bishop of Basel, six mayors of Basel and a principal of Basel University came from this noble family. In 1394 Margrave Rudolf III. enfeoffed Heinrich Reich von Reichenstein with the right for high justice regarding the village of Inzlingen and afterwards the family was in a position to acquire also a substantial landholding within this village and named themselves Lords of Inzlingen. A first major conversion of the castle dated 1563 to 1566. A copper engraving published 1625 shows the buildings at this time. Later (1674 to 1745) the buildings were converted to a Baroque style and in about 1750 a Baroque interior (Stucco; Overdoor; Masonry heater) followed.

Since 1820 the castle was a domicile for a weaving mill producing silk ribbons and afterwards it was used for a century as a farm house. In 1969 Inzlingen Castle was purchased by the municipality of Inzlingen and renovated thereafter. Since 1978 it functions as city hall of the municipality of Inzlingen. Furthermore, there is a luxury restaurant within the castle.

In 1980 the Deutsche Post issued a stamp showing an engraving of Inzlingen castle.

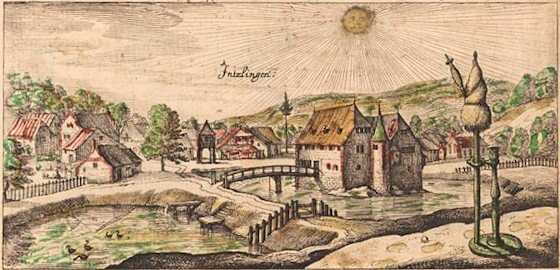
Copper engraving 1625

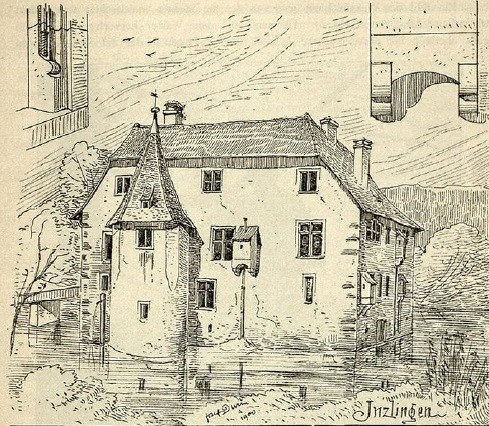
Drawing 1901

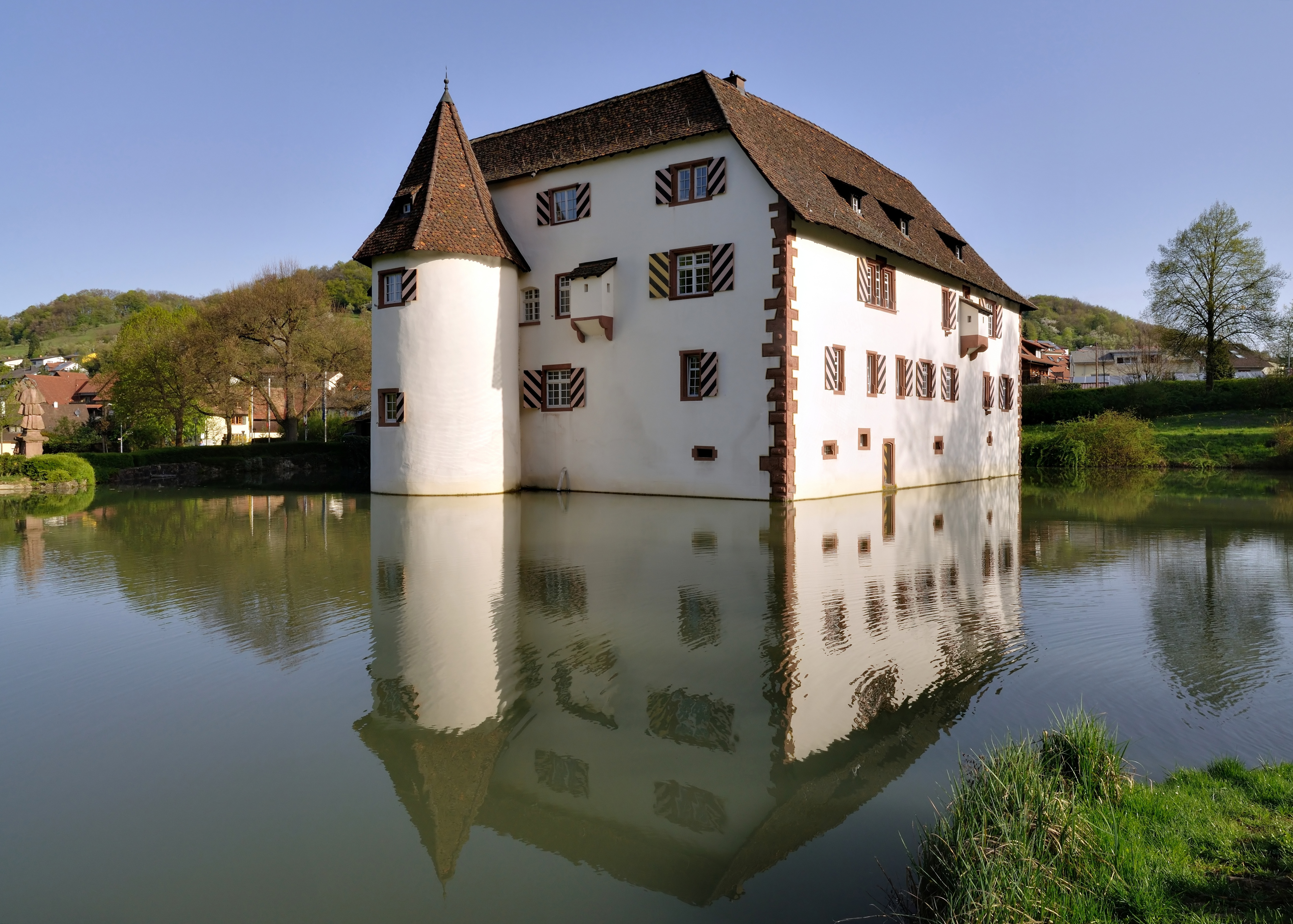
Photo 2011

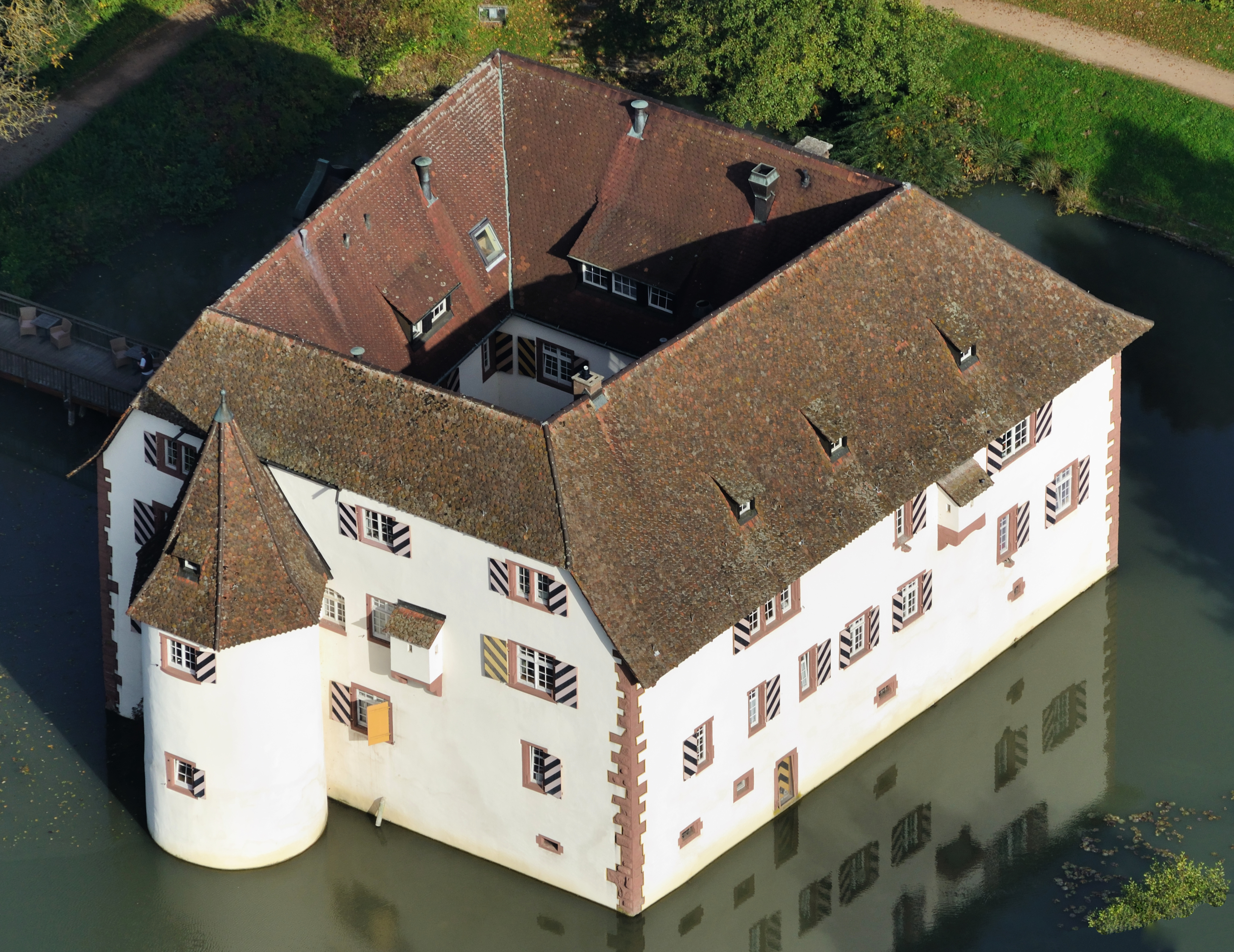
Aerial view 2012

== Bibliography ==
- Emil A. Erdin: Das Wasserschloss Inzlingen. In: Nachrichten des Schweizerischen Burgenvereins, Band 51, Heft 5, 1978 online, Retrieved Mai 1, 2013
