= Château du Hohlandsbourg =

Ruined castle in Grand Est, France

Coordinates: 48°3′36″N 7°16′9″E

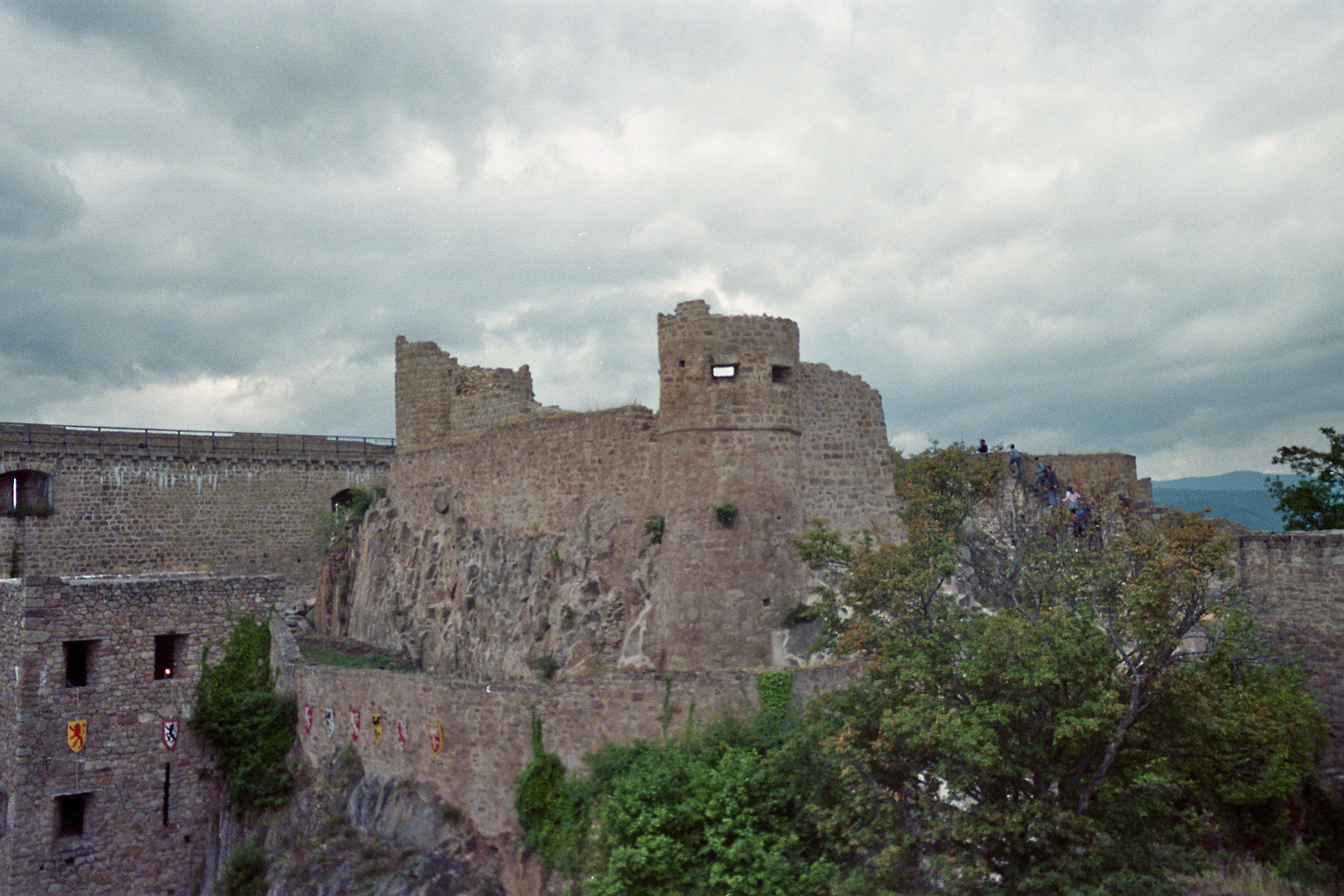
Keep

The Château du Hohlandsbourg or Hohlandsberg is a ruined castle in the commune of Wintzenheim, near Colmar, in the Haut-Rhin département of France. It is open to the public between Easter and 11 November.

== History ==
The construction of the castle, on the order of the Provost of Colmar, Siegfried de Gundolsheim, dates from 1279. The site, 620 m above sea level, allowed for surveillance of Colmar and its region. In 1281, the townspeople of Colmar revolted and set fire to the castle with the help of the Bailiff, Otton d'Ochenstein.

The castle came under the control of the Ensisheims before being given in 1410 as a fiefdom to the Ribeaupierres, then Counts of Lupfen, who enlarged it. In the 16th century, the castle belonged to Lazarus von Schwendi, general of the Holy Roman Empire, who, it is said, brought Tokay vines from Hungary to Alsace. He enlarged and strengthened the castle.

With Alsace becoming French at the end of the Thirty Years' War, the castle welcomed troops who blew it up in 1637 to prevent it falling into the hands of an Austrian army.

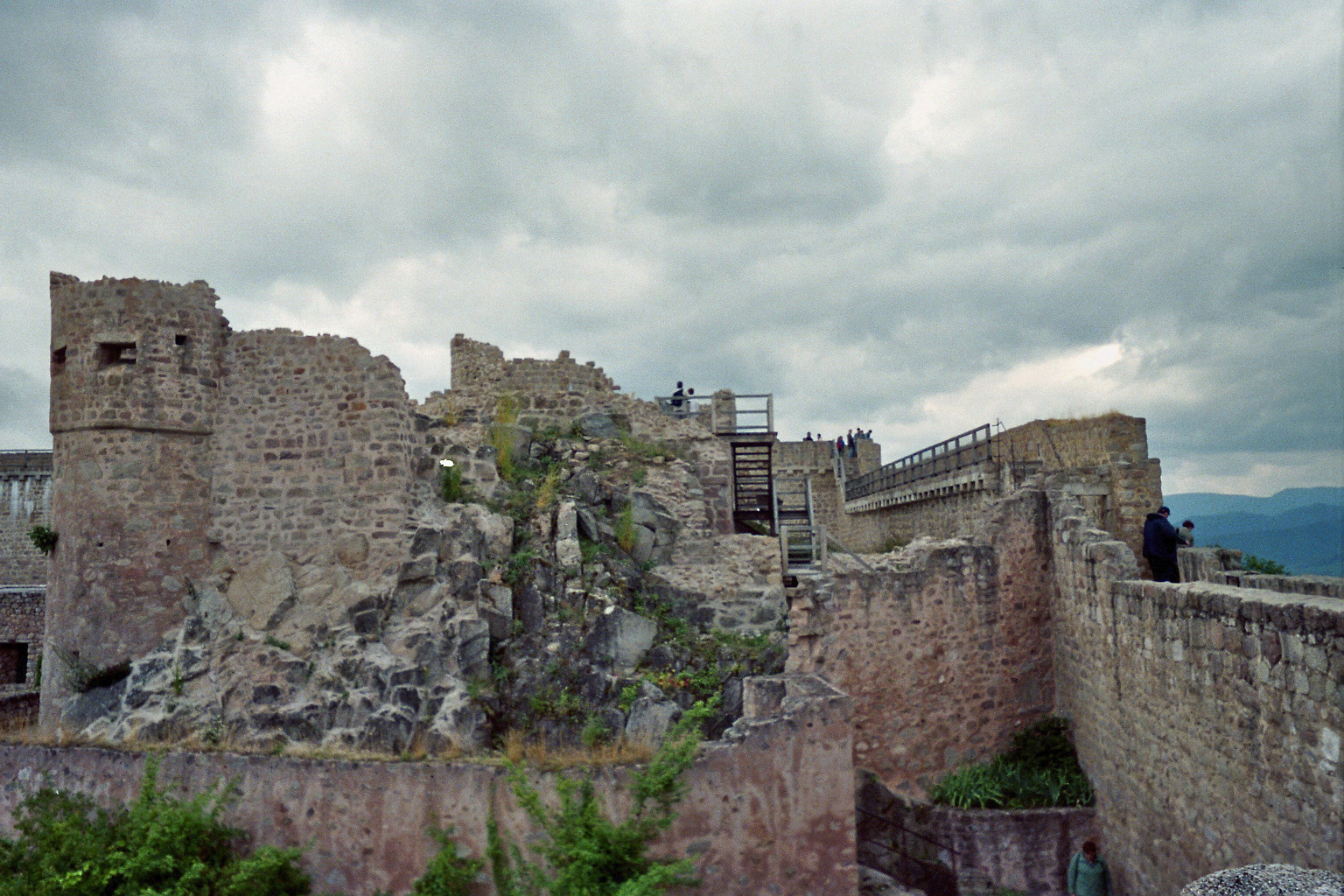
Keep and round walk

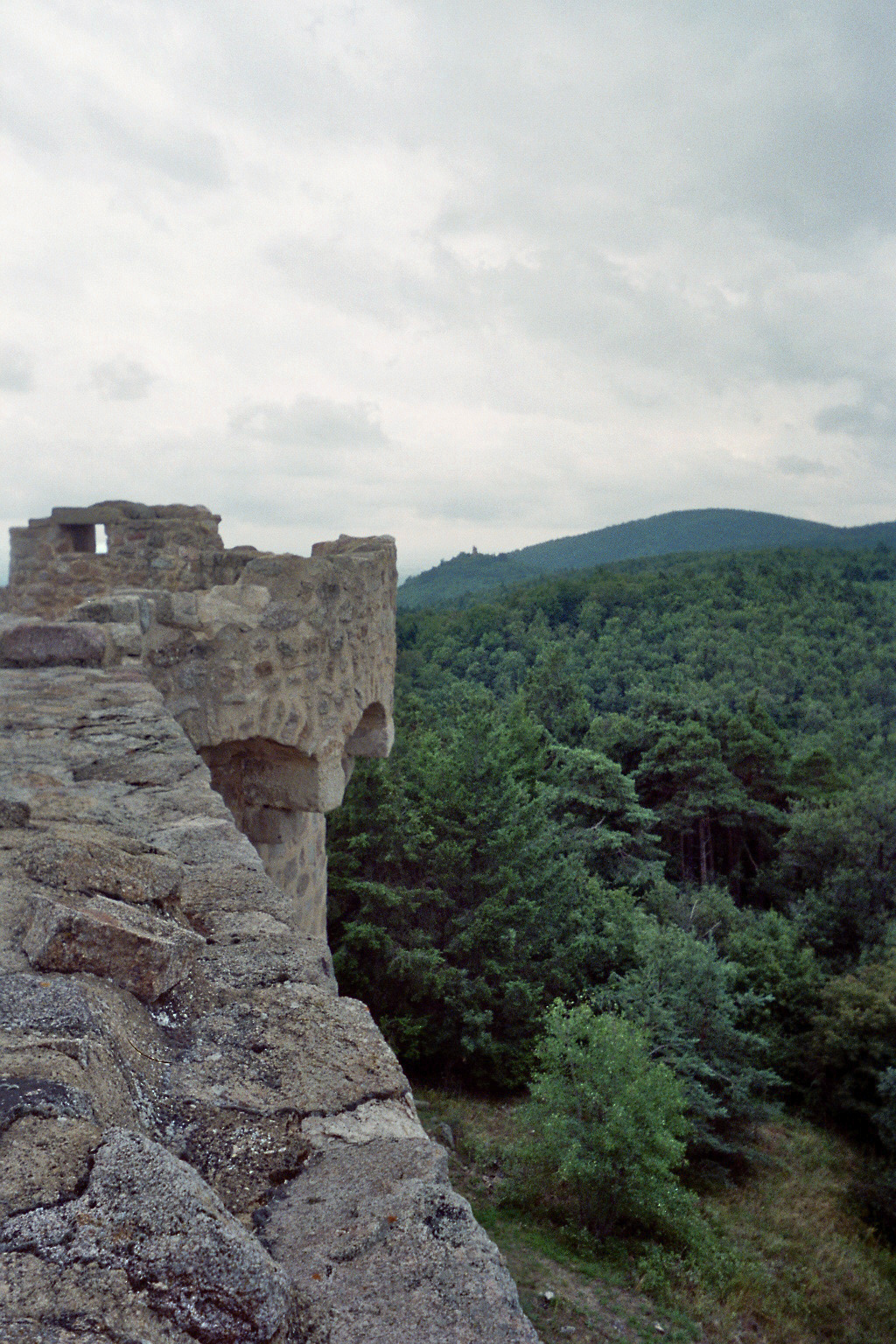
View from the round walk

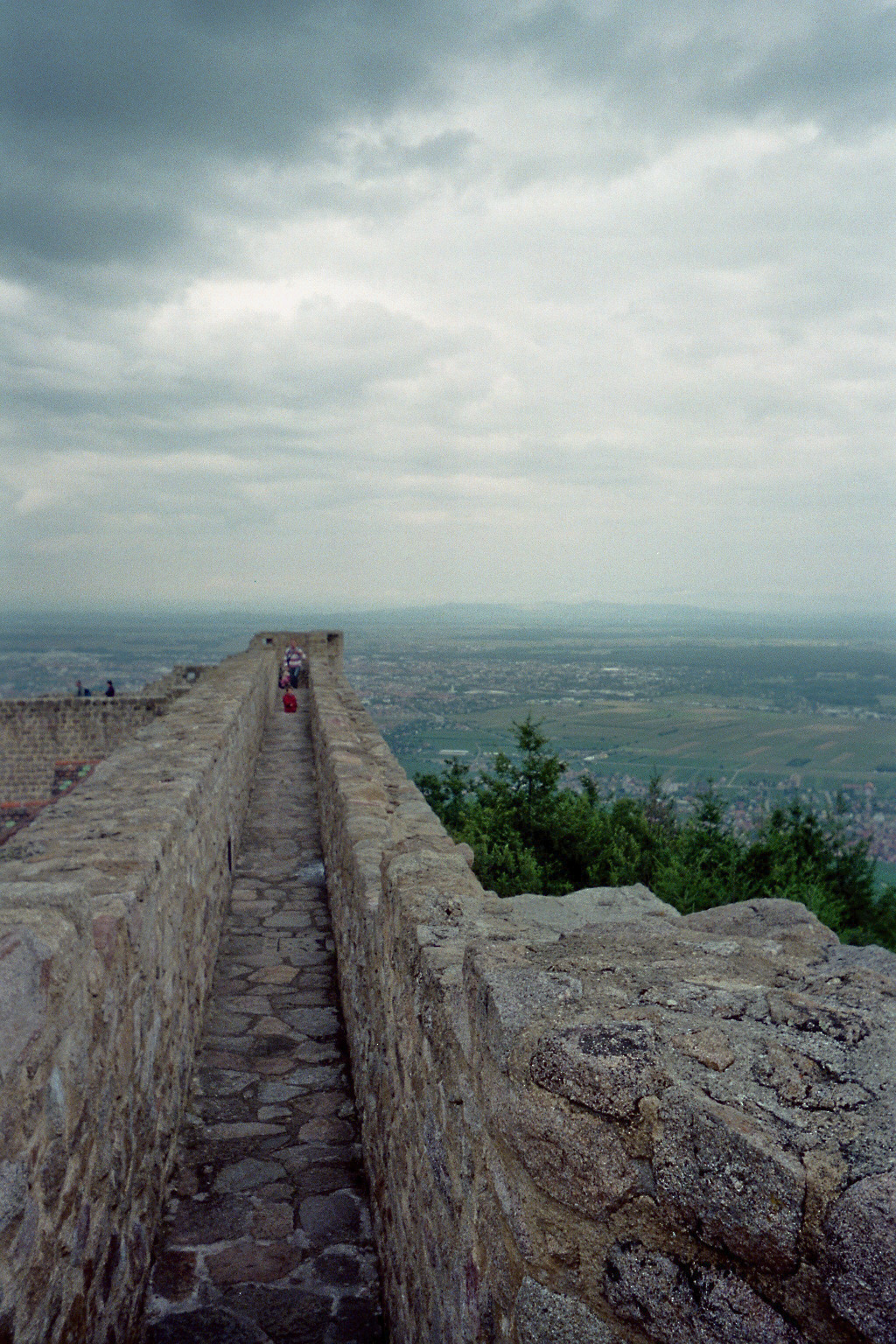
Round walk

It has been listed since 1840 as a monument historique by the French Ministry of Culture. The castle was restored during the 1990s to become a cultural and historical centre.

== See also ==
- List of castles in France
