= Kientzheim =

Part of Kaysersberg-Vignoble in Grand Est, France

- Part of Kaysersberg Vignoble
- Coat of arms
- Location of Kientzheim
- Location within France Location within Grand Est
- Coordinates: 48°08′13″N 7°17′12″E
- Country: France
- Region: Grand Est
- Department: Haut-Rhin
- Arrondissement: Colmar-Ribeauvillé
- Canton: Sainte-Marie-aux-Mines
- Commune: Kaysersberg Vignoble
- Area^{1}: 4.83 km^{2} (1.86 sq mi)
- Elevation: 225 m (738 ft)
- Highest elevation: 662 m (2,172 ft)
- Lowest elevation: 220 m (720 ft)
- Population (2021): 721
  - Density: 149/km^{2} (387/sq mi)
- Time zone: UTC+01:00 (CET)
  - Summer (DST): UTC+02:00 (CEST)
- Postal code: 68240
- ^{1} French Land Register data, which excludes lakes, ponds, glaciers > 1 km^{2} (0.386 sq mi or 247 acres) and river estuaries.

Kientzheim (French: [kintsajm]; German: Kienzheim; Alsatian: Kientza) is a former commune in the Haut-Rhin department in north-eastern France. On 1 January 2016, it was merged into the new commune Kaysersberg Vignoble.

== Population ==
Historical population
Year	Pop.	±% p.a.
2006	794	—
2011	747	−1.21%
2021	721	−0.35%
Source: INSEE

== Education ==
The village has a primary school: "les Crecelles".

The Lycée Seijo, a Japanese boarding school, operated in Kientzheim from 1986 to 2005. The European Centre for Japanese Studies in Alsace (French: Centre européen d'études japonaises, CEEJA, Japanese: アルザス・欧州日本学研究所 Aruzasu Ōshū Nihongaku Kenkyūsho) opened at the site of the former school.

== See also ==
- Communes of the Haut-Rhin département
