= Château de Kaysersberg =

Ruined castle in Grand Est, France

Coordinates: 48°8′25″N 7°15′44″E

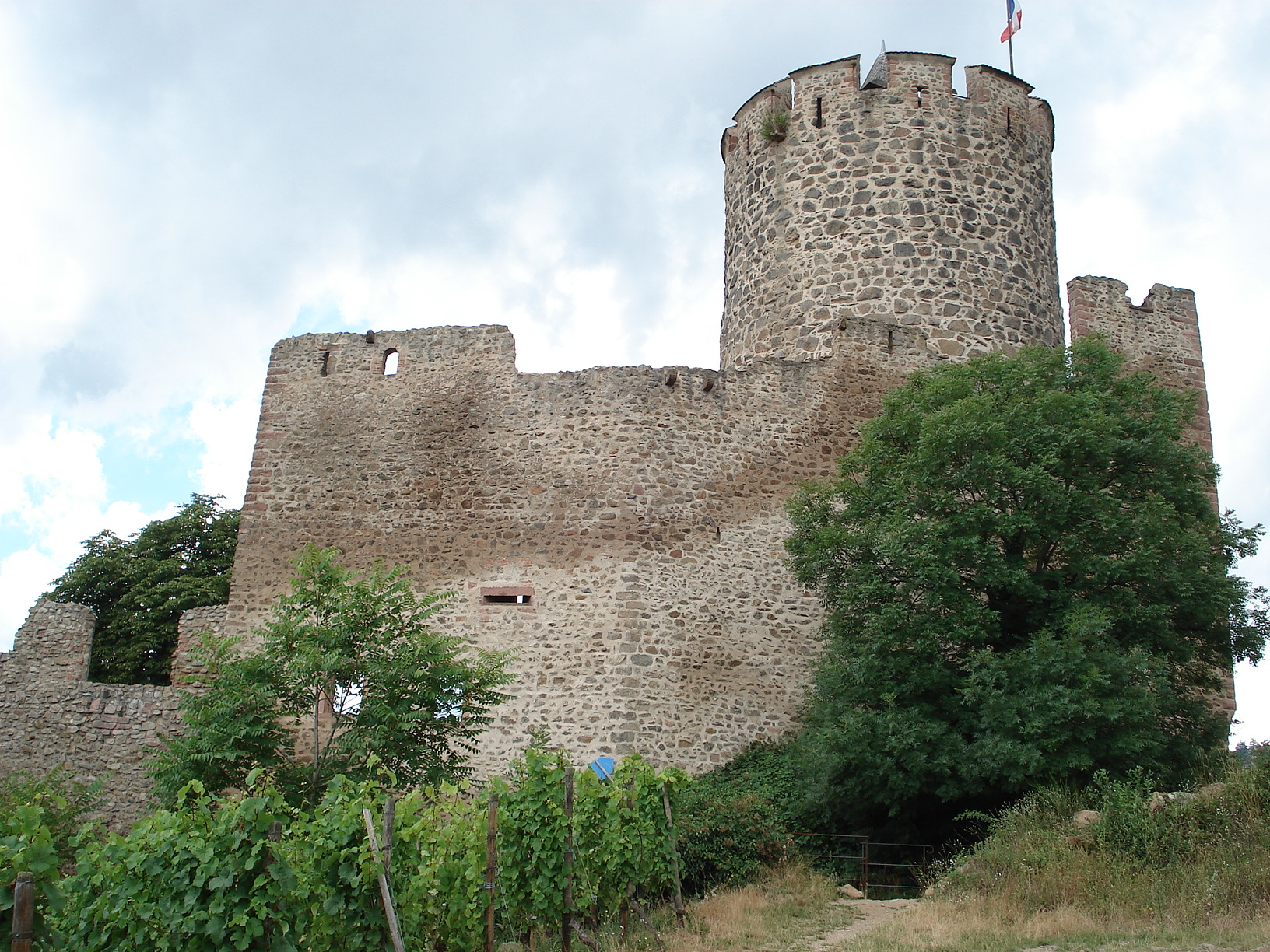
Kaysersberg castle

The Château de Kaysersberg (also: Schlossberg) is a ruined castle in the commune of Kaysersberg in the Haut-Rhin département of France.

== History ==
The castle was built for Albin Woelflin, imperial bailiff for Frederick II, Holy Roman Emperor, around 1220. The site was acquired in 1227 by the lords of Horbourg and Ribeaupierre. It had an important strategic role as it allowed the Empire to close off one of the routes across the Vosges Mountains towards Lorraine. The circular keep is the oldest part of the castle and one of the first of this type in the upper Rhine valley. It was designed at the same time as the keep at the Château de Pflixbourg. The first curtain wall, which included the keep, was replaced after 1261 by a wall enclosing the keep, according to a contemporary plan, which allowed an uninterrupted circuit of the walls and strengthened defences on the side likely to be attacked. In the 14th century, the castle was the residence of the imperial provost or bailiff. Following a fire, the enceinte was raised to 4 m. In the second half of the 15th century, the castle defences were modernised in response to developments in artillery and firearms; the crenels were closed with wooden shutters, the merlons were equipped with firing slits and the round walk was completely covered. In this period, the castle was merely a sub-bailliage and personnel were heavily reduced. During the German Peasants' War (1524/5), the castle was besieged. It was restored by Lazarre de Schwendi in 1583.

According to archaeological excavations and studies, the castle was abandoned at the end of the 16th century. After the French Revolution, it was declared a national asset and sold to François Joseph Boecklin de Boecklinsau, who planted vines, and later passed to the Bastard family.

== Description ==
The castle is largely built from granite. It stands at an altitude of 295 m (approx. 975 ft) and dominates from 50m the north side of the town. The castle has a triangular plan dominated by the circular keep in the highest point. The keep is 11 m (36 ft) in diameter with walls 4.42 m (14 1/2 ft) thick. The original parapet has been kept to a height of 0.55 m, with the crenels and merlons restored. The spiral staircase is concrete. Access is to the first floor, through an arched doorway. The spacious third floor served as a storeroom and provided access to the platform which was originally covered. The keep had a purely military function. The main residential buildings were situated against the east curtain wall. On the other side, towards the town, was a large lower courtyard. The entrance to the castle, in the east, was by an arched doorway with a barbican; to the left is a cruciform cannon opening and a circular firing hole. The castle's enceinte is linked to the town's by curtain walls with a round walk.

The Château de Kaysersberg has been listed as a monument historique by the French Ministry of Culture since 1841.

== See also ==
- List of castles in France
