= Église Sainte-Croix, Kaysersberg =

Coordinates: 48°08′20″N 7°15′49″E

Église Sainte-Croix
- Église de l′Invention de la Sainte-Croix
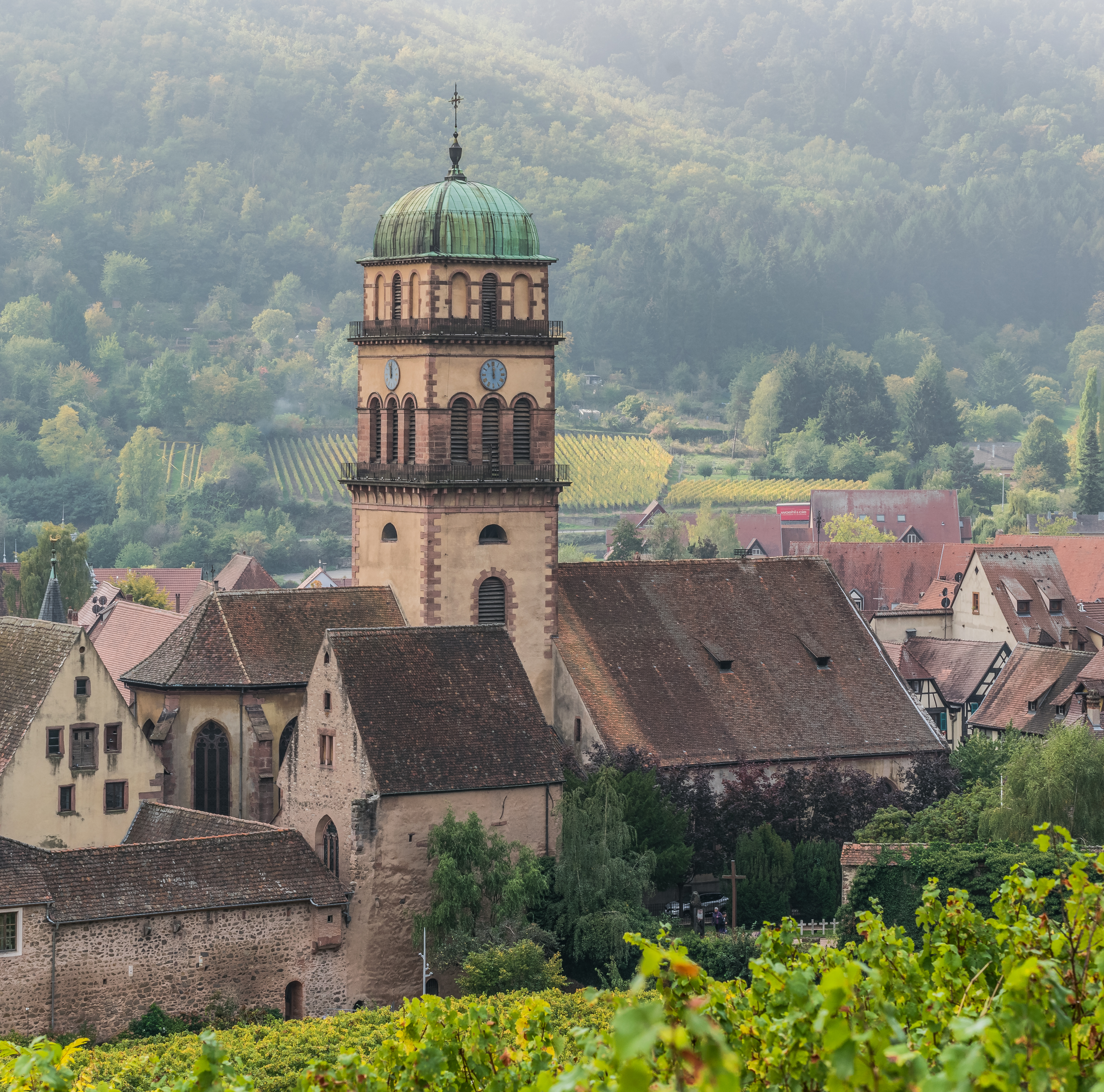
- Église Sainte-Croix
- Location: Kaysersberg
- Country: France
- Denomination: Catholic

History
- Founded: 13th century
- Dedication: True Cross

Architecture
- Heritage designation: Monument historique
- Designated: 11 May 1932
- Style: Romanesque; Gothic; Historicism
- Completed: 19th century

Specifications
- Length: 29 m (95 ft) (inside)
- Height: 12.35 m (40.5 ft) (inside)
- Materials: sandstone

Administration
- Archdiocese: Archdiocese of Strasbourg
- Parish: Communauté de paroisses « Au pied du Galtz »

The Église de l′Invention de la Sainte-Croix (″Church of the Discovery of the Holy Cross″) or, colloquially, Église Sainte-Croix (″Holy Cross Church″) is the mostly medieval parish church of the small town of Kaysersberg, in the Haut-Rhin department of France. The church is situated on the Romanesque Road of Alsace thanks to its ornate sandstone portal from ca. 1230–1235; it is classified as a Monument historique by the French Ministry of Culture since 1932.

The Holy Cross Church was built in the first half of the 13th century, then expanded and modified in the 15th century, and finally partially modified again in the first half of the 19th century, when the steeple was crowned with its characteristic dome.

The church is filled with notable artworks, all of which are classified as Monuments historiques. Chief among them are the large wooden polychrome altarpiece of the Passion of Jesus, a 1518 work by the Colmar master Hans Bongart, with painted 1621 wings by an otherwise unknown Mathias Wuest; a large triumphal cross — height 425 cm (167 in) — from the late 15th century; a 1521 limewood relief of the Lamentation of Christ; a 1514 sandstone Entombment of Christ; a 1720 pipe organ; besides a substantial number of statues, altars, crucifixes, liturgical objects, and other items ranging from the 15th to the 19th century.

== Gallery ==
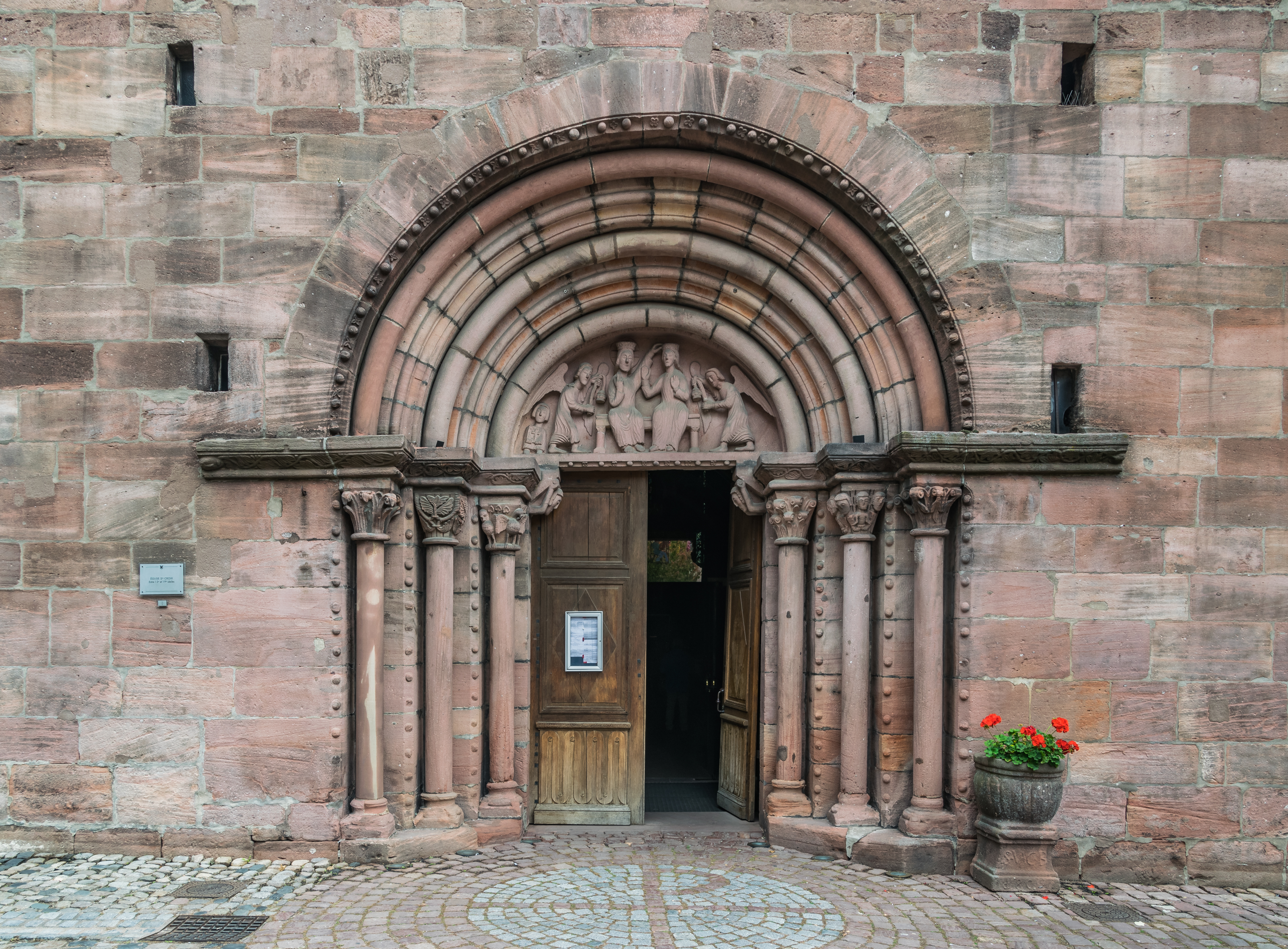
Romanesque main portal (1230s)

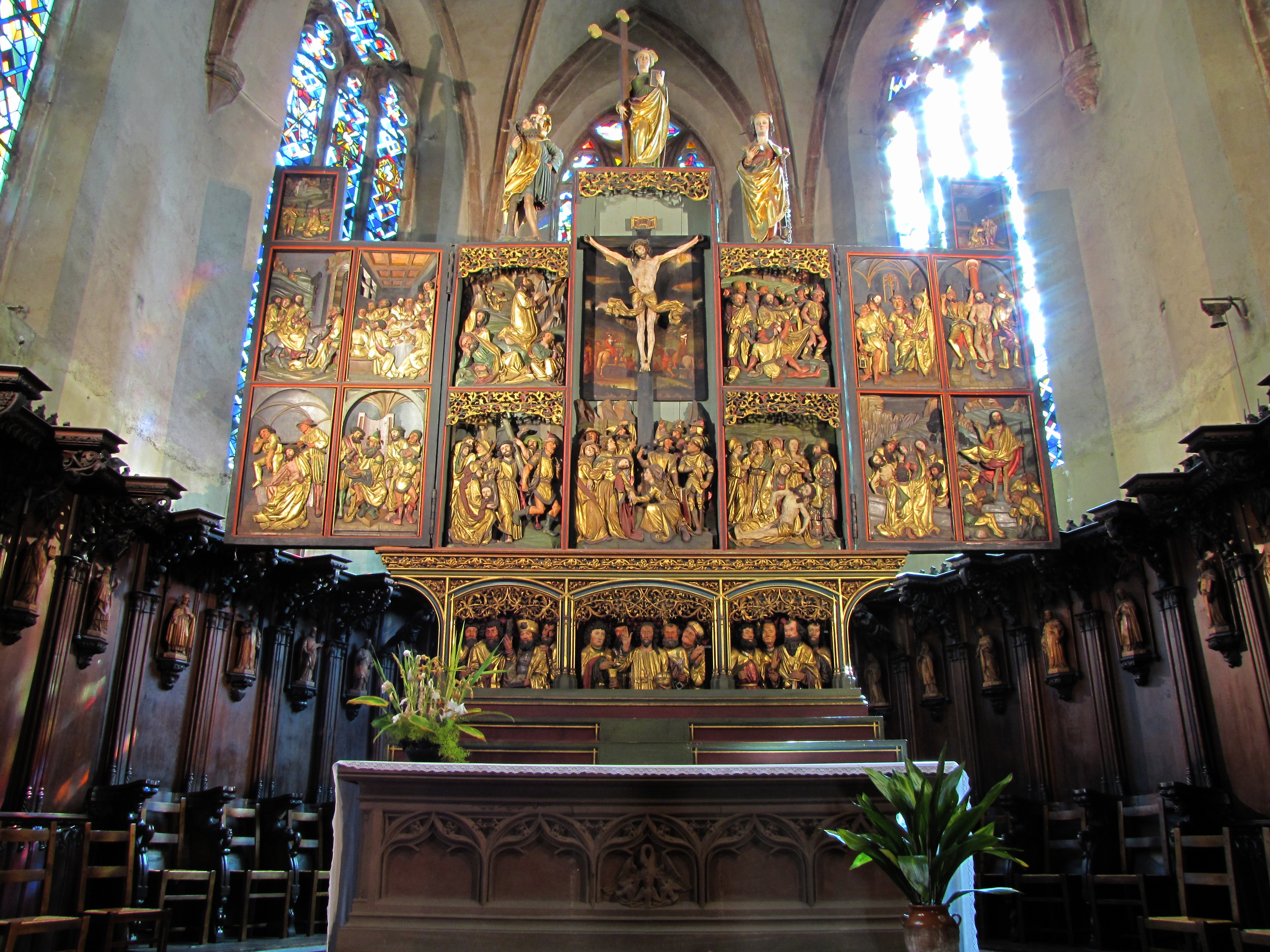
Altarpiece of the Passion (1518)

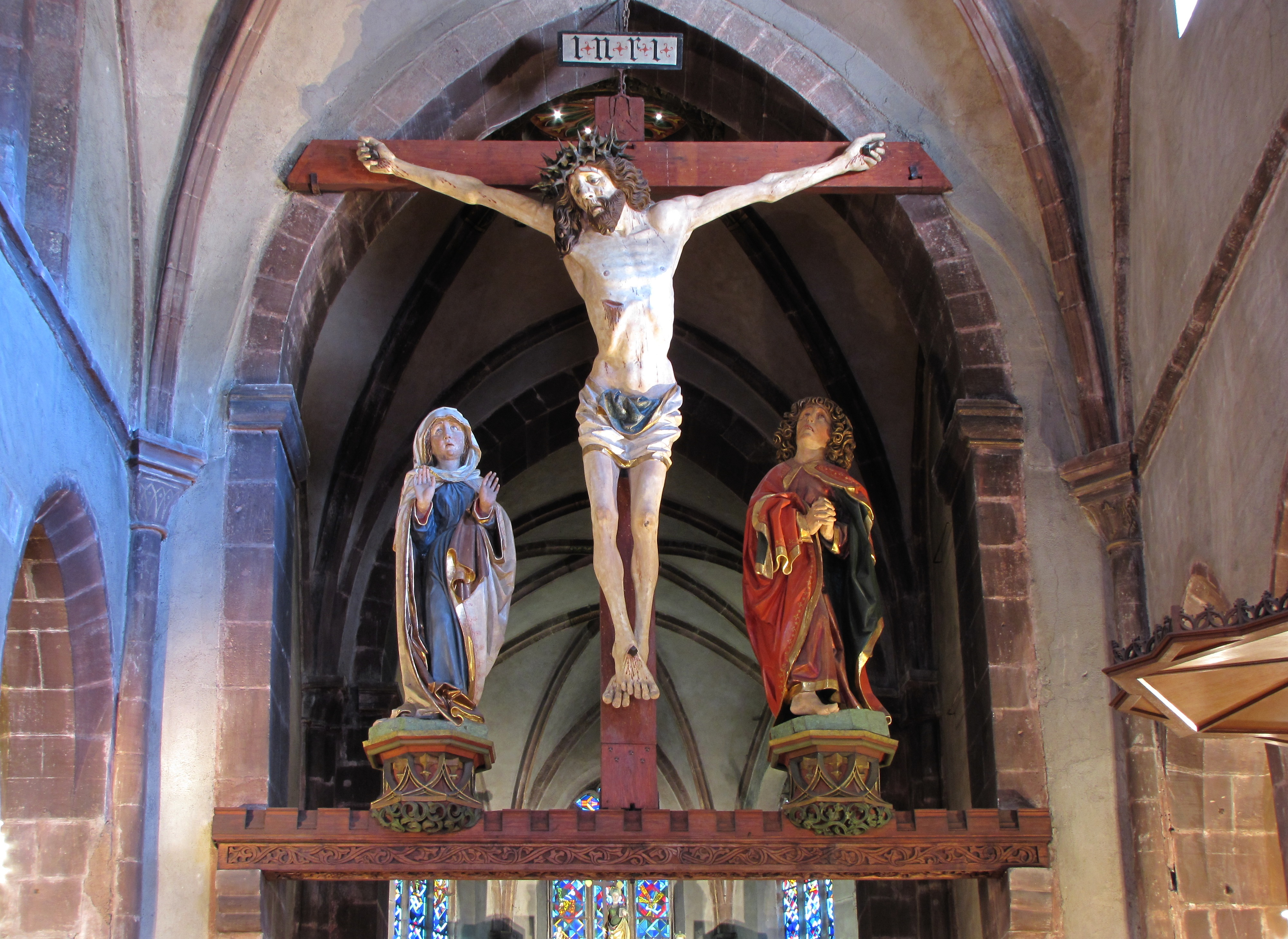
Triumphal cross (1470s or 1480s)

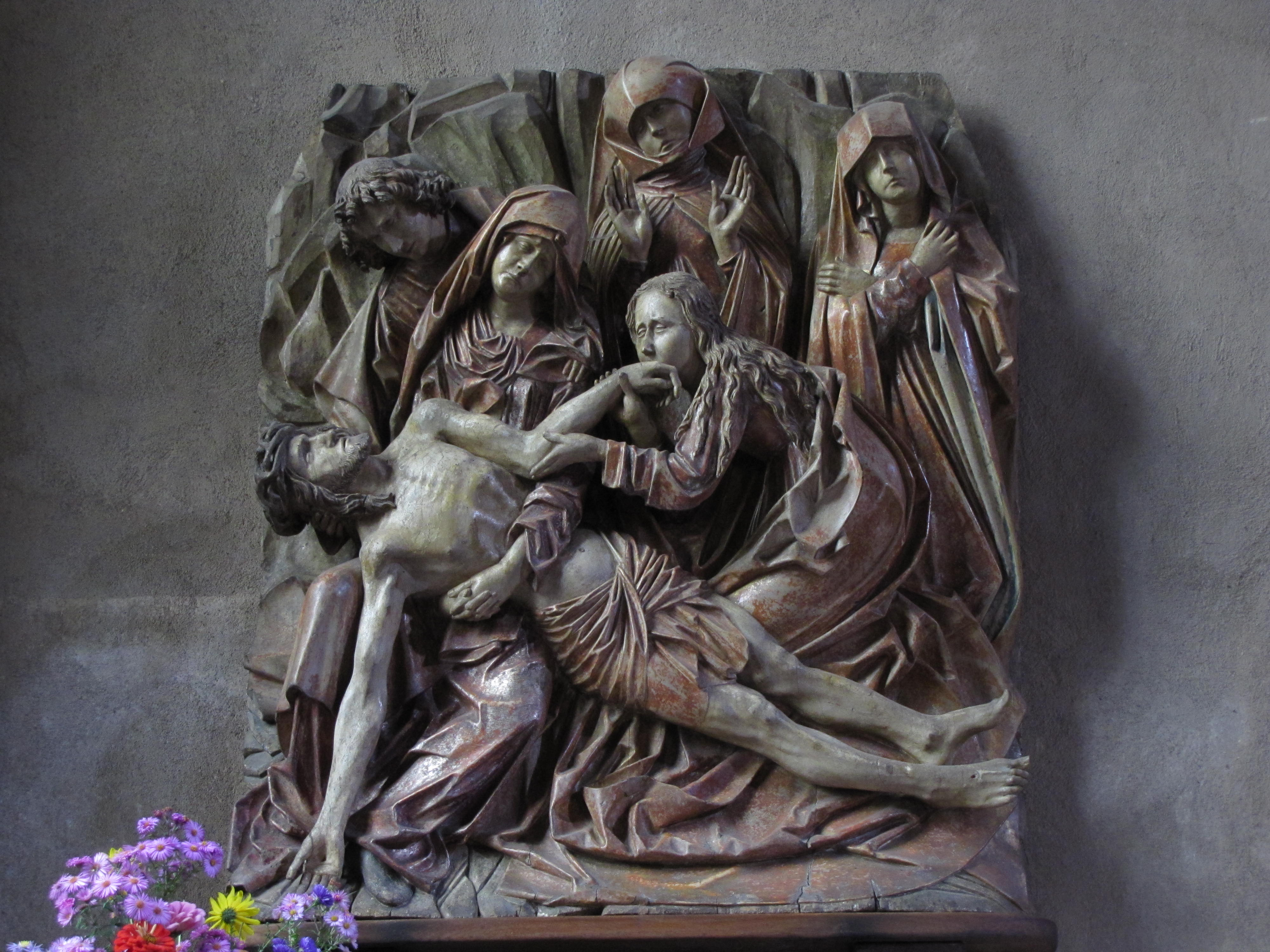
Lamentation of Christ (1521)

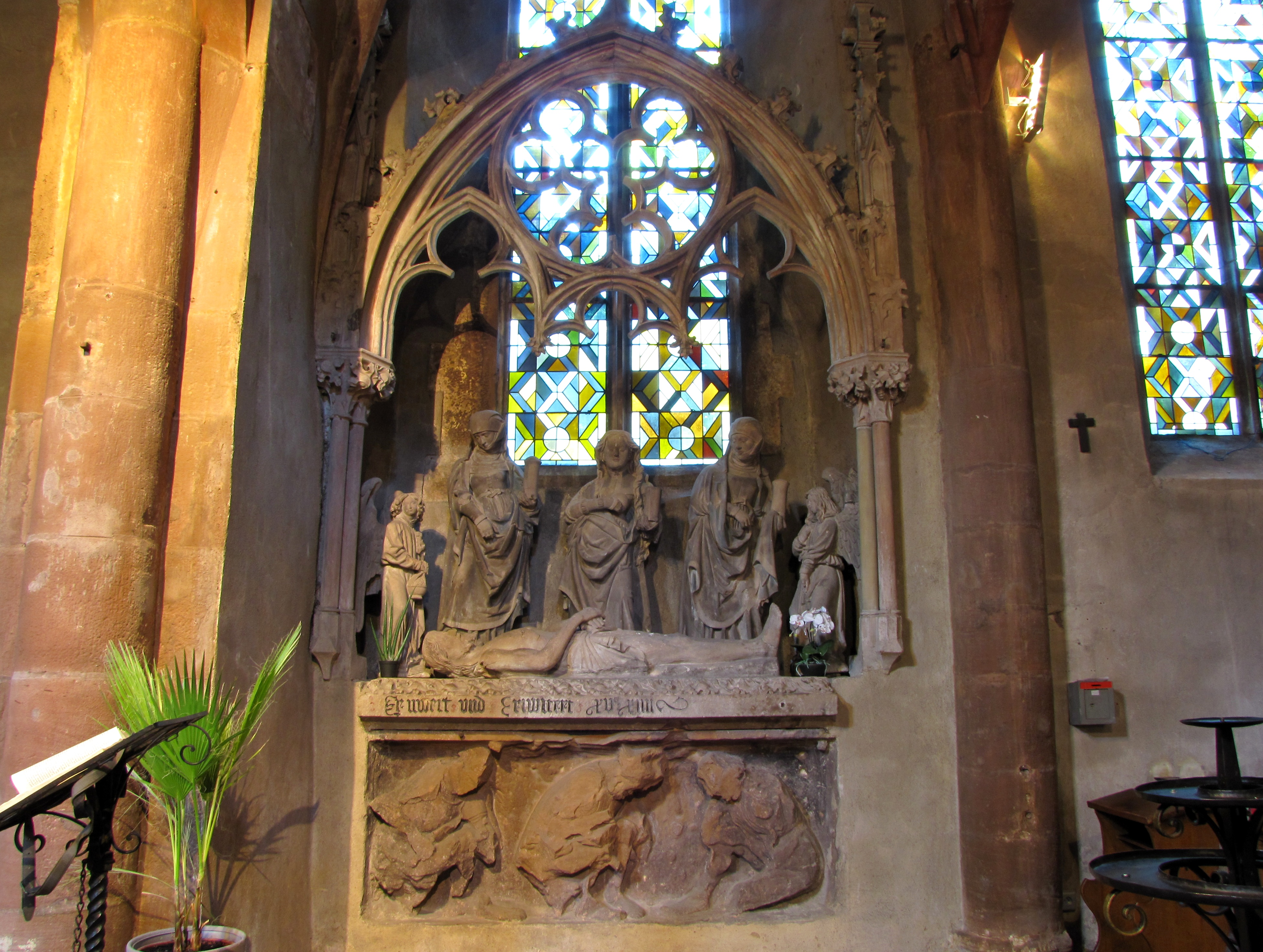
Entombment of Christ (1514)

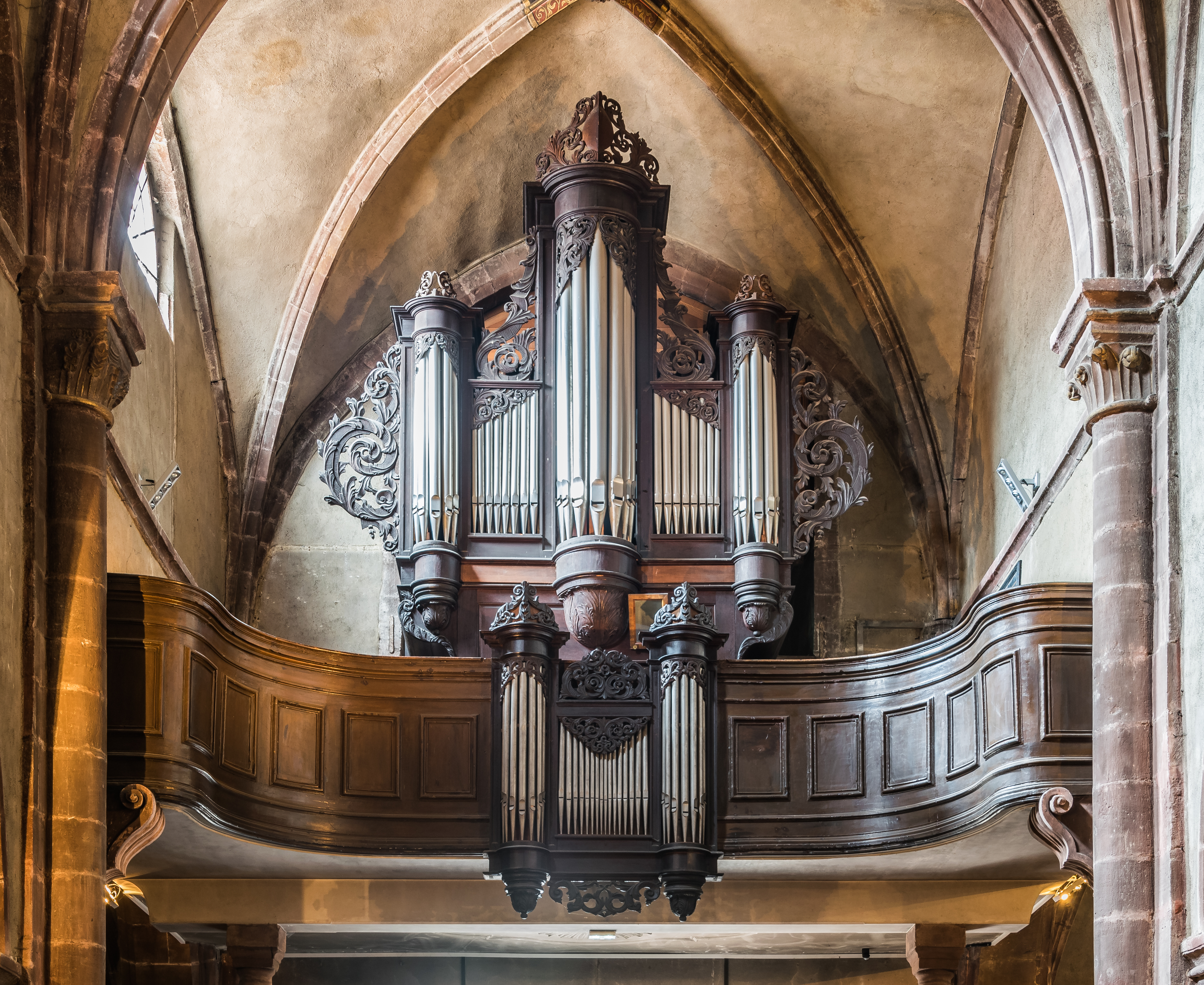
Pipe organ (1720)
