= Kaysersberg =

Commune in Alsace, France

Kaysersberg Kaiserschbarig (Alsatian)
- Delegated commune of Kaysersberg Vignoble
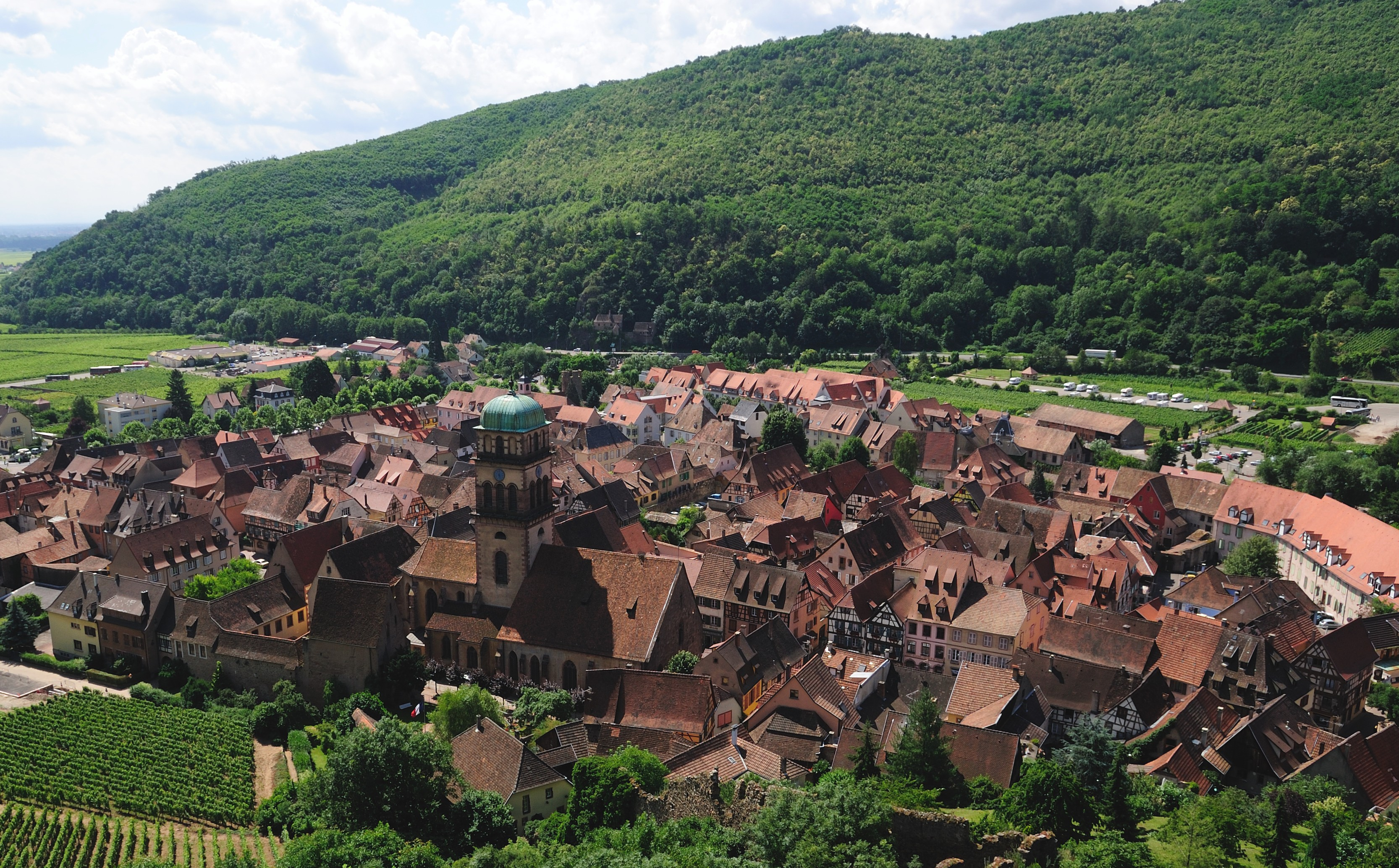
- The town as seen from the castle

- Coat of arms
- Location of Kaysersberg
- Location within France Location within Grand Est
- Coordinates: 48°08′N 7°16′E
- Country: France
- Region: Grand Est
- Department: Haut-Rhin
- Arrondissement: Colmar-Ribeauvillé
- Canton: Sainte-Marie-aux-Mines
- Commune: Kaysersberg Vignoble
- Area^{1}: 24.82 km^{2} (9.58 sq mi)
- Elevation: 240 m (790 ft)
- Highest elevation: 924 m (3,031 ft)
- Lowest elevation: 236 m (774 ft)
- Population (2022): 2,720
  - Density: 110/km^{2} (284/sq mi)
- Time zone: UTC+01:00 (CET)
  - Summer (DST): UTC+02:00 (CEST)
- Postal code: 68240
- ^{1} French Land Register data, which excludes lakes, ponds, glaciers > 1 km^{2} (0.386 sq mi or 247 acres) and river estuaries.

Kaysersberg (French: [kajzœʁsbɛʁɡ]; Alsatian: Kaiserschbarig) is a historical town and former commune in Alsace in northeastern France. The name is German for Emperor's Mountain. The high fortress that dominates the town serves as a reminder of both its strategic importance and its warlike past.

Kaysersberg lies in the canton of Sainte-Marie-aux-Mines, which itself is a subdivision of the Colmar-Ribeauvillé arrondissement. It was a separate commune until 1 January 2016, when it was merged into the new commune of Kaysersberg Vignoble together with nearby Kientzheim and Sigolsheim, and remains its seat.

The town was first mentioned in 1227, when Frederick II, Holy Roman Emperor purchased the castle and gave orders to refortify it. During the Middle Ages, Kaysersberg, a member of the Décapole, prospered. In 1648, the city became a part of France, although most inhabitants continued to speak German. From 1871 to 1918 and (again from 1940 to 1944) Kaysersberg belonged to Germany.

In 2017 Kaysersberg was voted the Village préféré des Français (Village favoured by the French). The inhabitants are called Kaysersbergeois.

== Geography ==
Kaysersberg lies about 12 kilometres (7 mi) northwest of Colmar, on the eastern slopes of the Vosges mountains, on the river Weiss.

Kaysersberg lies on the Route des Vins d'Alsace (Alsace "Wine Route"). Kaysersberg is north of Ammerschwihr and south of Riquewihr.

== Population ==
Historical population
Year	Pop.	±% p.a.
1962	2,821	—
1968	2,979	+0.91%
1975	2,942	−0.18%
1982	2,707	−1.18%
1990	2,755	+0.22%
1999	2,676	−0.32%
2007	2,720	+0.20%
2012	2,705	−0.11%
2022	2,414	−1.13%
Source: EHESS and INSEE (2007-2022)

== Economy ==
The area around Kaysersberg is one of the finest wine-growing areas in Alsace. The first vines were brought here in the 16th century from Hungary, and wine production is still an important aspect of the town's economy today. Wine produced from the pinot gris variety is a local specialty.

== Culture ==
Kaysersberg is a historic town, that has preserved many architectural monuments. These include:

- Église Sainte-Croix, the oldest parts of which date from the 13th century
- Hôtel de ville (town hall), 16th century, renaissance style
- Oberhof chapel, 14th century
- Saint-Michel chapel, 16th century
- Château de Kaysersberg or Schlossberg, 13th century, partly ruined

== Folklore ==
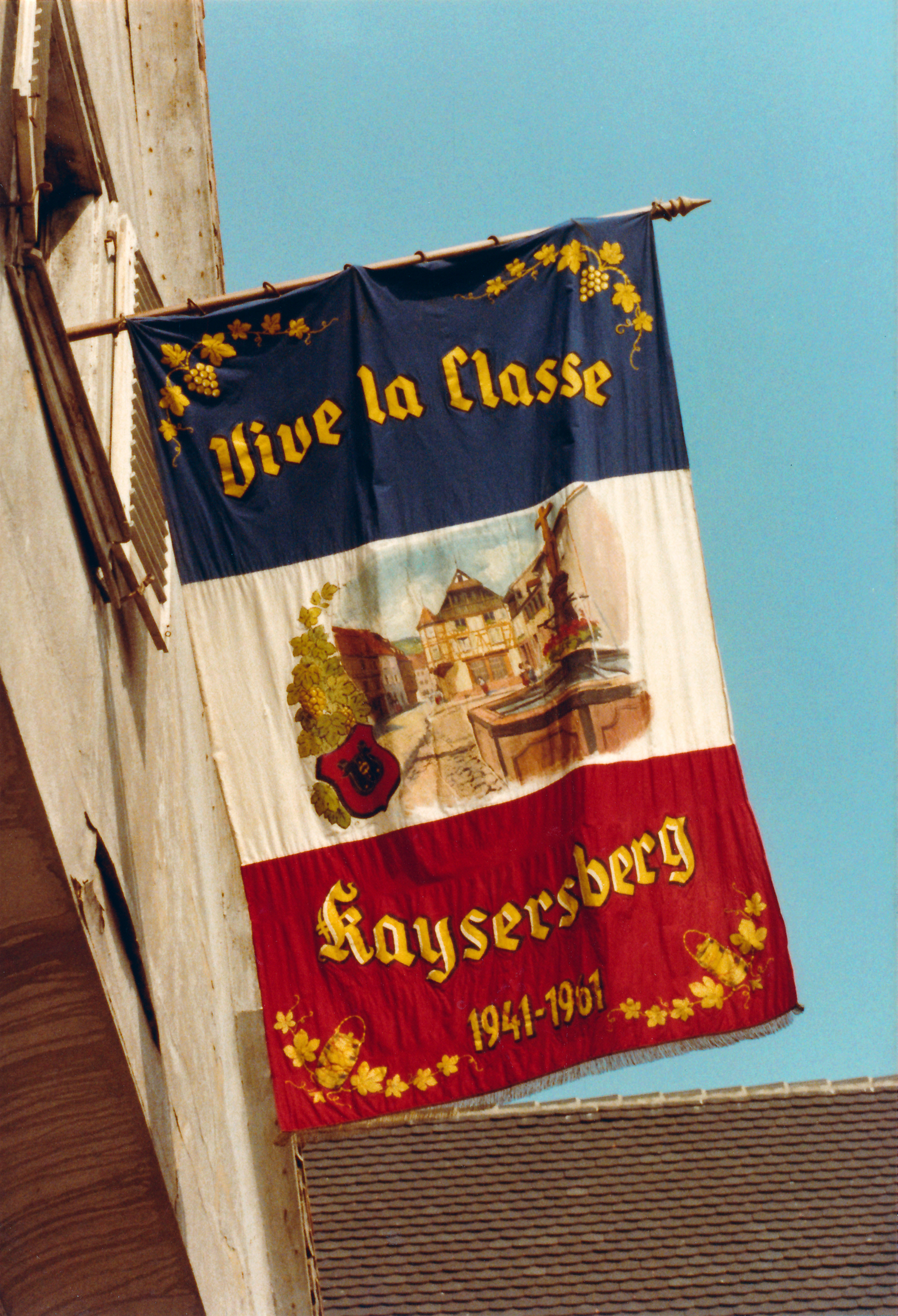
Conscripts' flag displayed in the window of a building on July 14th.

The town boasts several associations and folk groups that keep traditions alive throughout the year.

== Tourism ==
Kaysersberg is a tourist destination in Alsace, known for its medieval architecture, vineyards and location on the Alsace Wine Route. The town was voted Village préféré des Français (France's Favourite Village) in 2017.

=== Historic attractions ===
The ruins of Kaysersberg Castle, dating from the 13th century, overlook the town. Other historic attractions include the fortified bridge over the Weiss River, the Church of Sainte-Croix and the Renaissance town hall. Nearby castles include the ruins of Château de Wineck in Katzenthal, Château de Lupfen-Schwendi and Château de Reichenstein in Kientzheim.

=== Wine tourism ===
Kaysersberg lies on the Alsace Wine Route, a 170-kilometre tourist itinerary established in 1953 that passes through the wine-growing villages of Alsace. The surrounding vineyards are part of the region's wine tourism industry, with wine tasting, cellar visits and walking routes among the activities available to visitors.

Kaysersberg also serves as a starting point for exploring nearby wine-growing villages and vineyards, including the Schlossberg Grand Cru vineyard overlooking the town and the Kaefferkopf Grand Cru vineyard near Ammerschwihr. Visitors can explore the surrounding wine-producing area by car, bicycle or on foot, using local vineyard trails and cycling routes.

=== Christmas market ===
Kaysersberg hosts an annual Christmas market during the four weekends of Advent. Held in the historic centre, around the Cour de l'Arsenal and the Church of Sainte-Croix, the market features approximately 30 stalls selling handmade crafts and regional products. Seasonal activities also include exhibitions and concerts.

=== Accommodation and gastronomy ===
Visitor accommodation in Kaysersberg and the surrounding valley includes hotels, guesthouses, holiday cottages (gîtes) and furnished holiday rentals (meublés de tourisme). Self-catering accommodation is available in apartments, individual houses and chalets. The Kaysersberg Valley Tourist Office maintains a directory of holiday rentals throughout the area. The town is also a destination for gastronomy. Le Chambard is a hotel in the historic centre housing La Table d'Olivier Nasti, a restaurant recognised by the Michelin Guide for its contemporary interpretation of regional cuisine. The establishment also includes a traditional Alsatian winstub.

== Notable people ==
- Matthäus Zell (1477–1548), Protestant reformer
- Albert Schweitzer (1875–1965), theologian, musician, philosopher, and physician

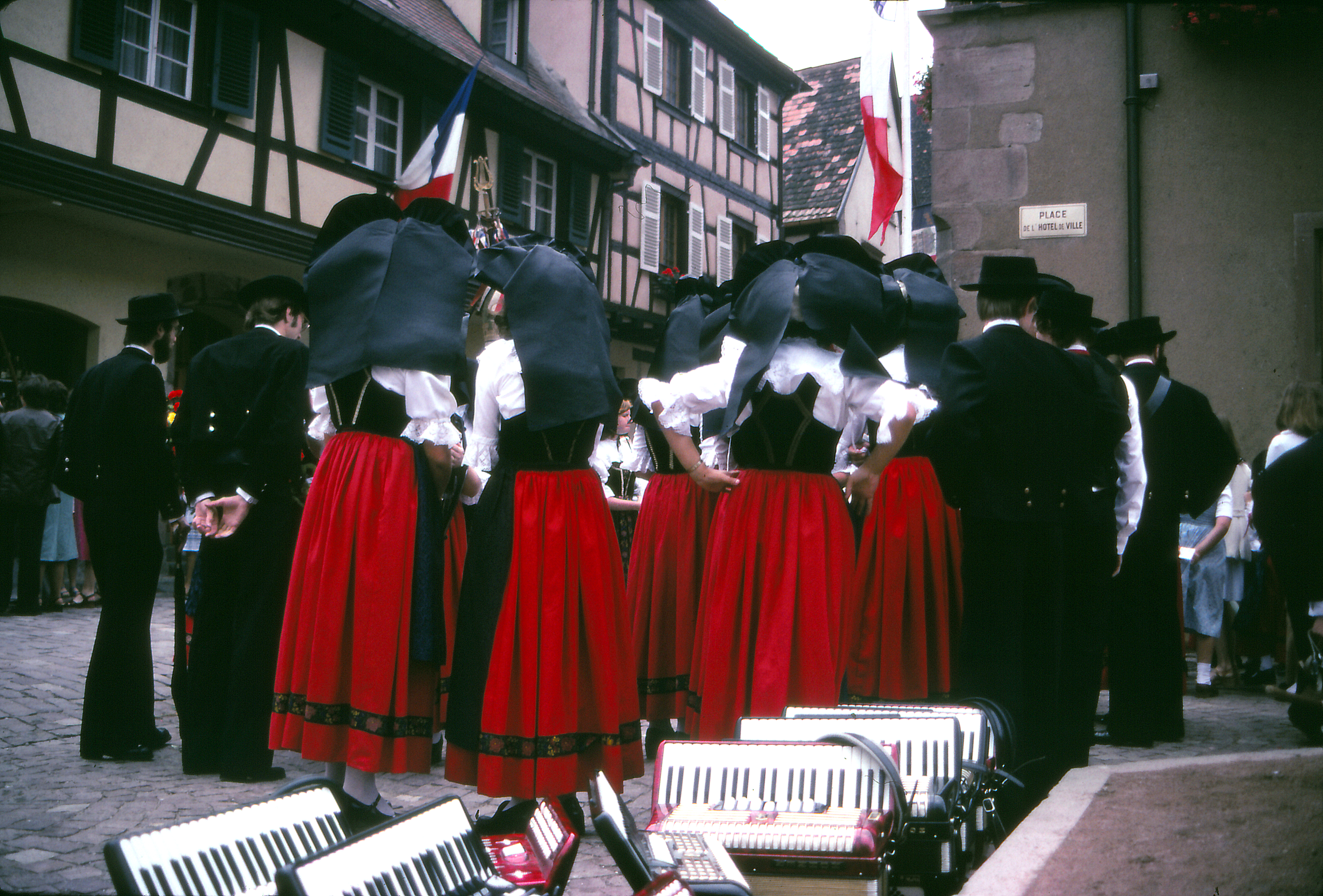
Members of "L'Accordéon Club folklorique Écho du château" gathered in the Town Hall square on July 14, 1979.

== Gallery ==
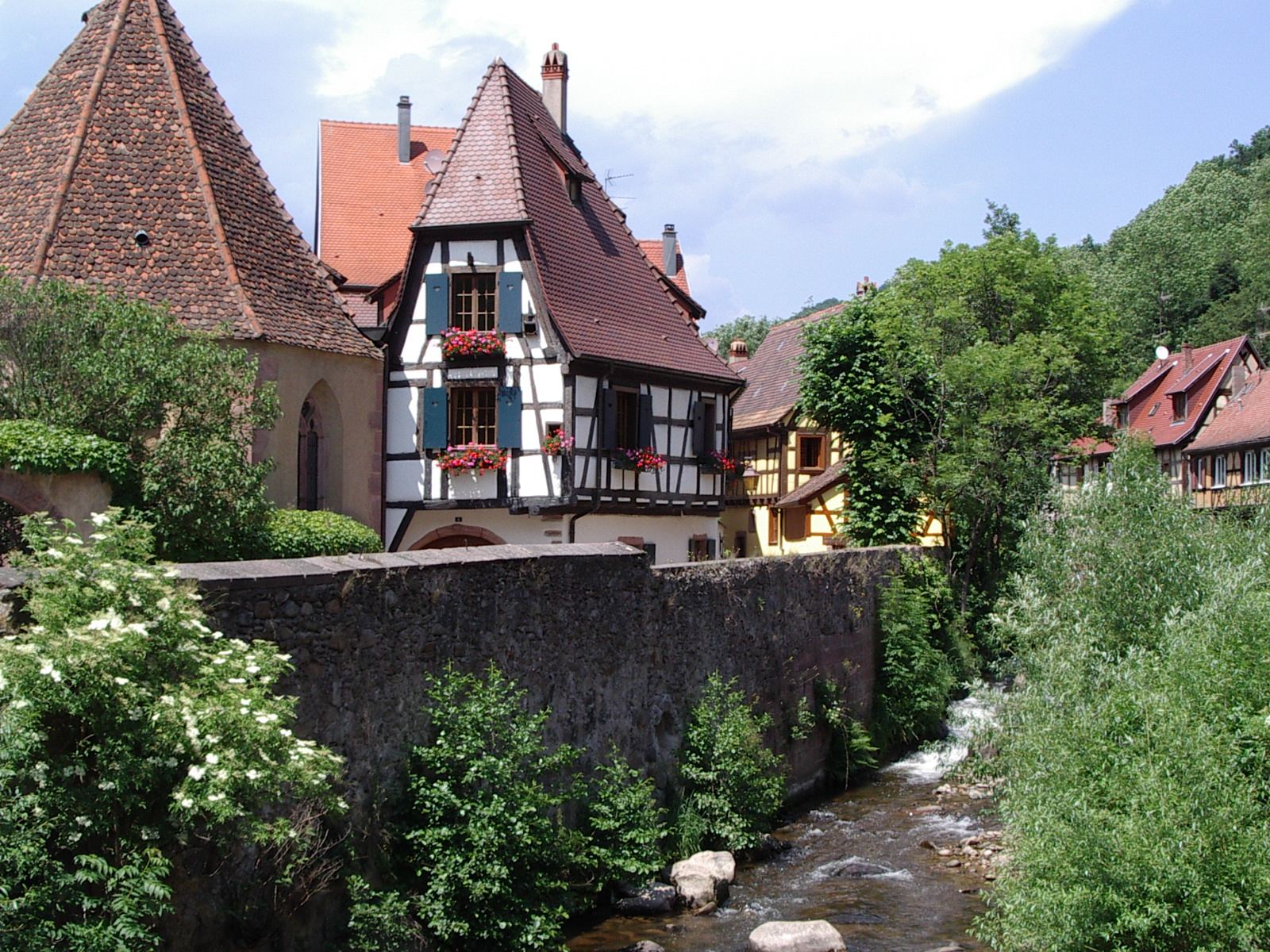
On the left, Oberhof chapel

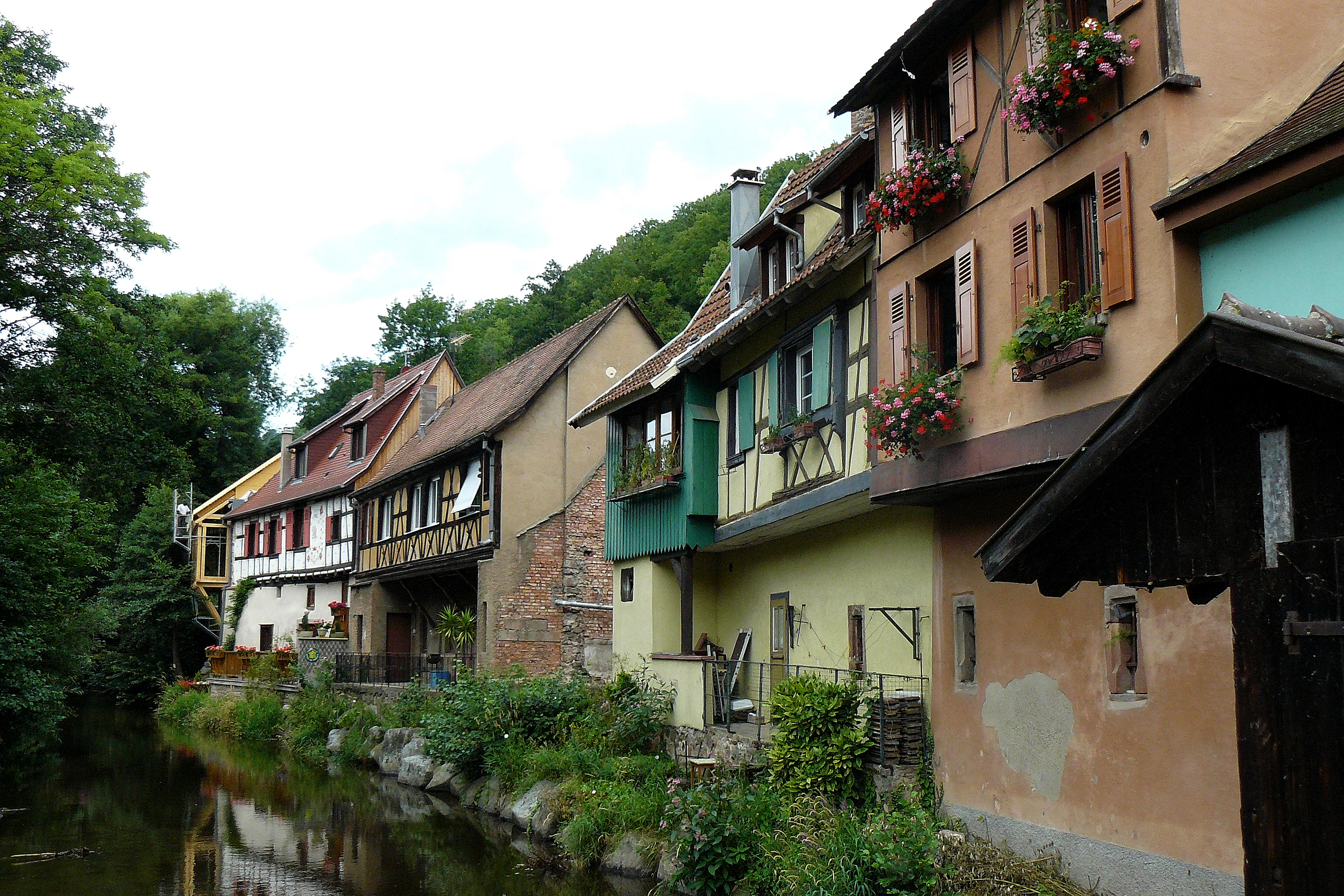
View of Kaysersberg

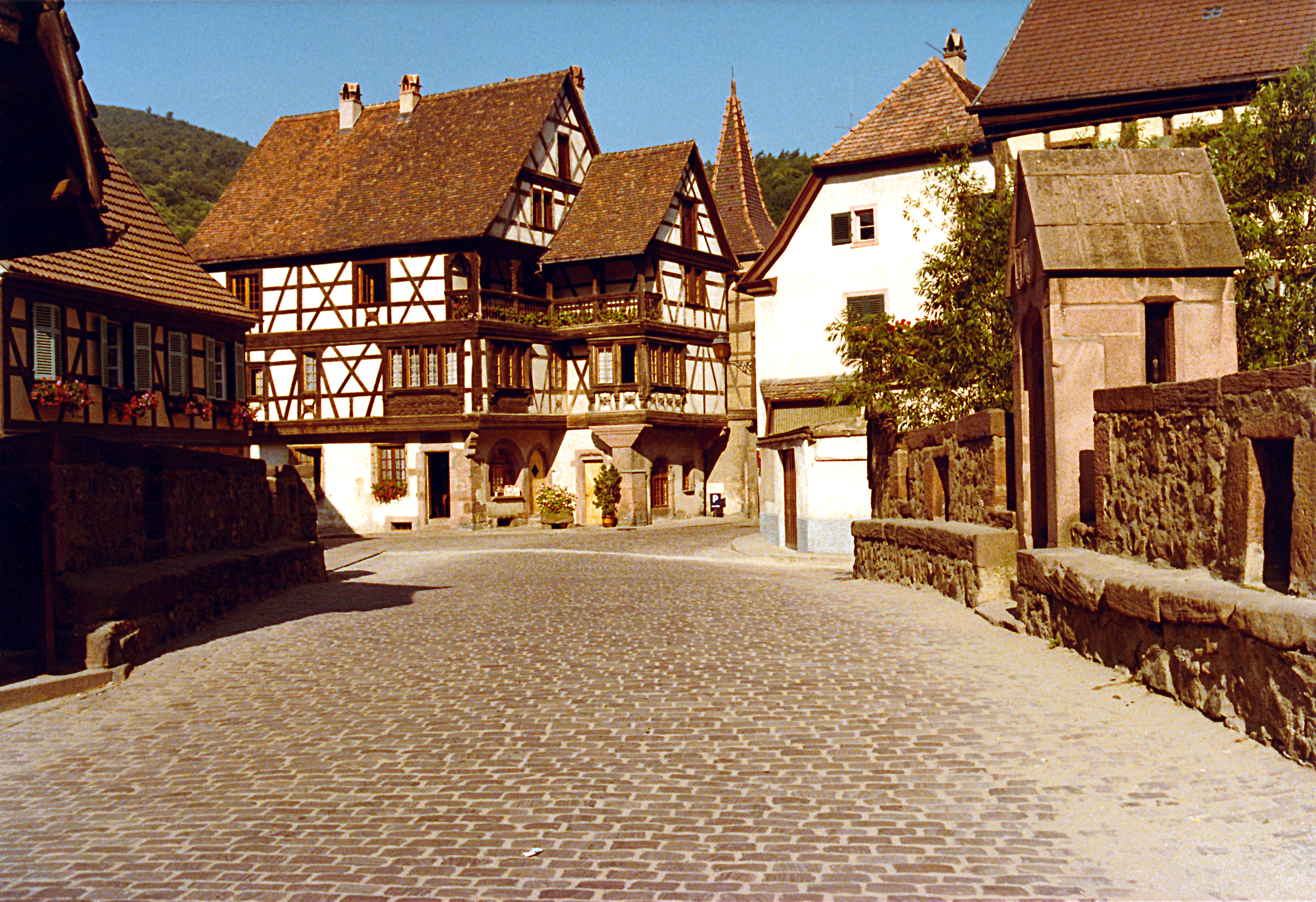
The fortified bridge (1501) over the Weiss.

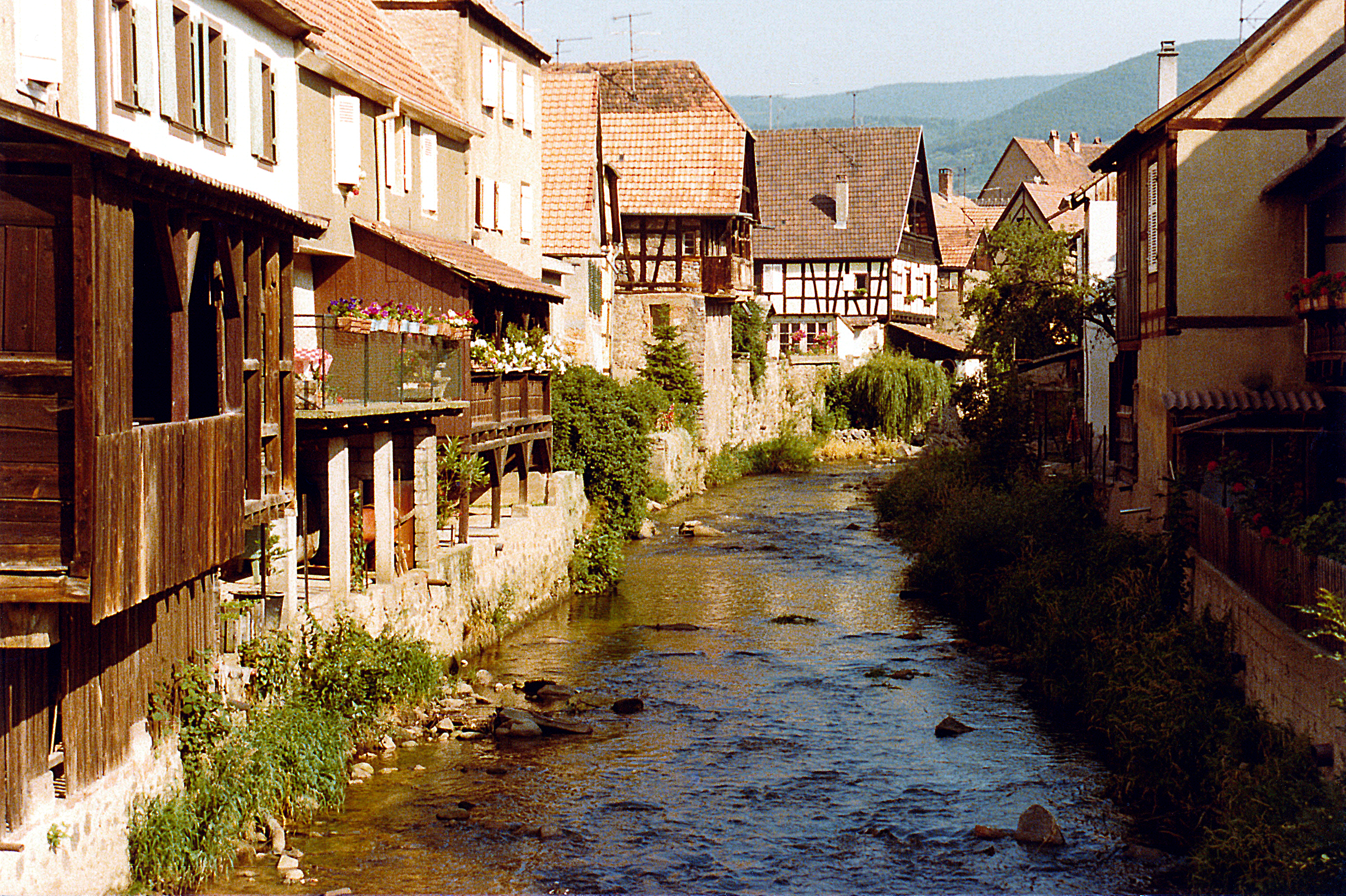
The Weiss.

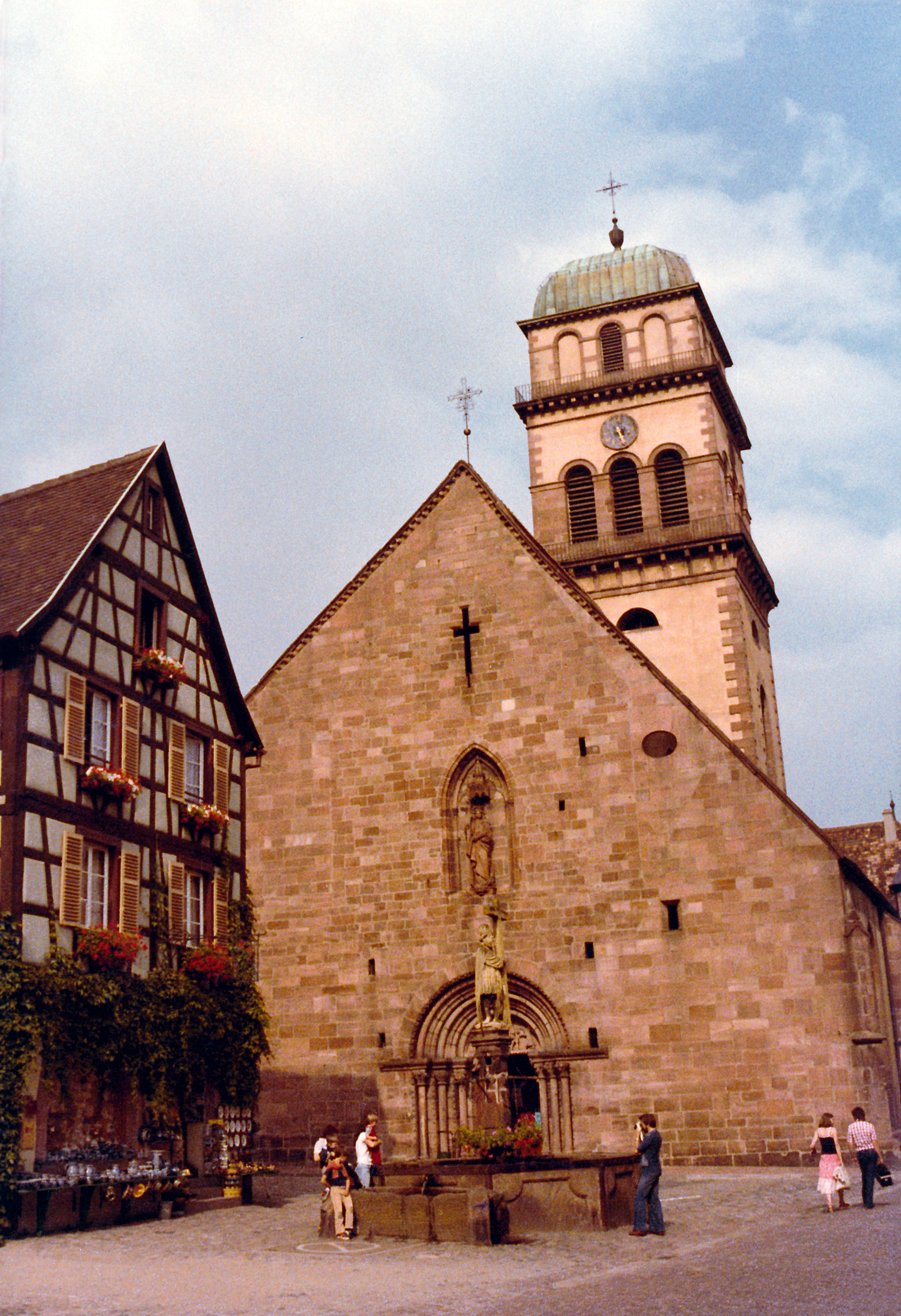
Fountain and facade of Holy Cross Church

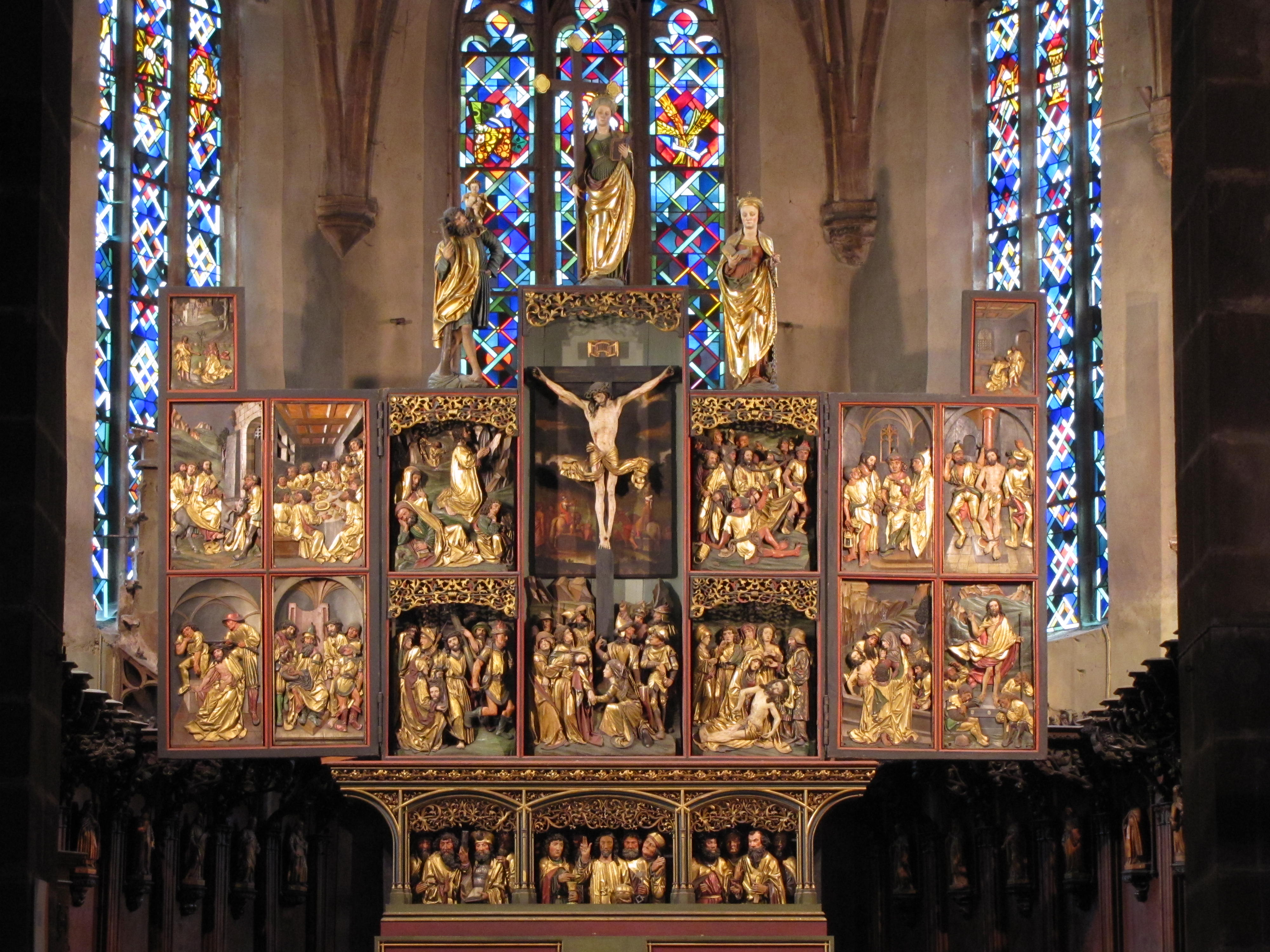
1518 altar inside the medieval church

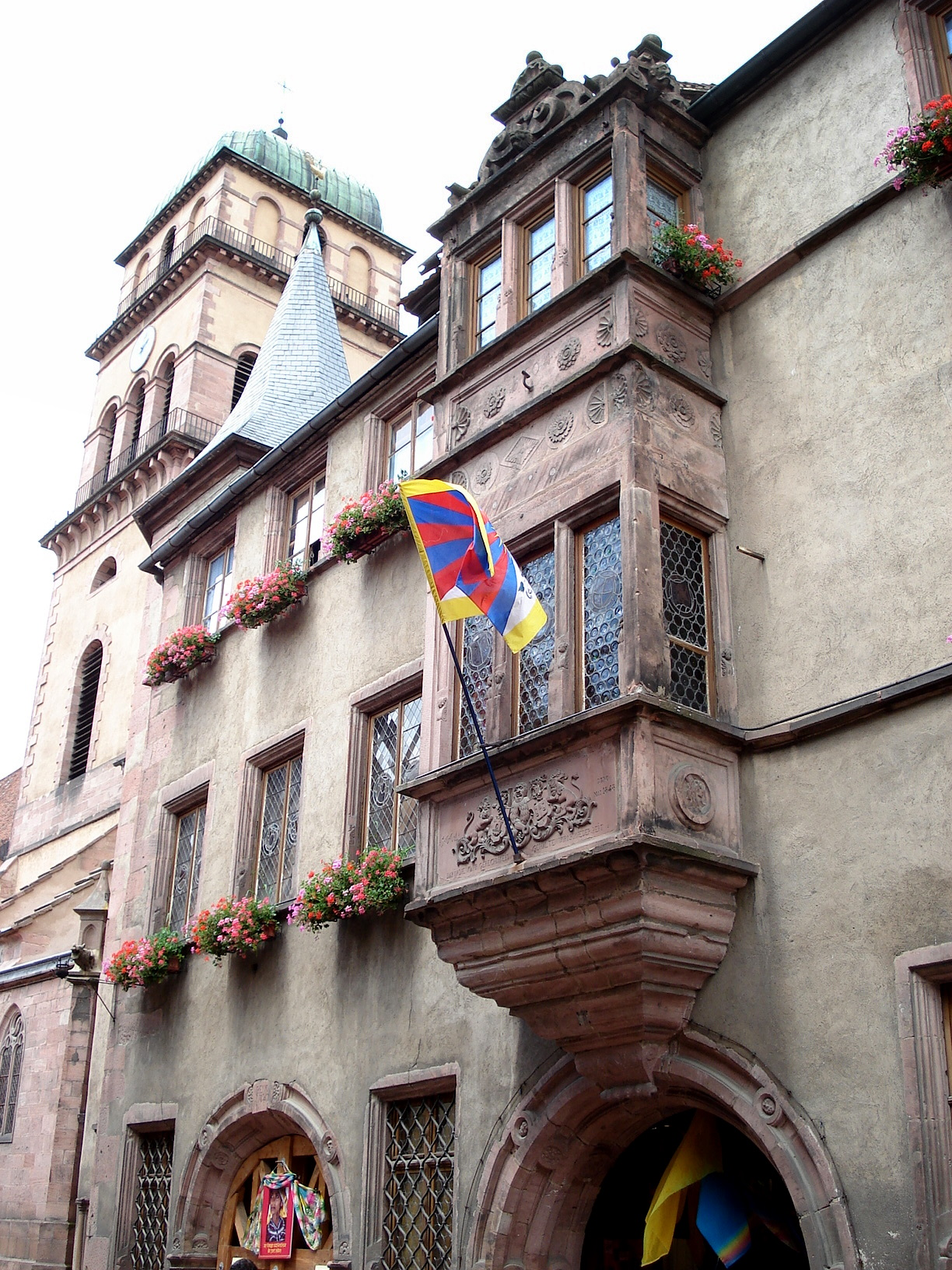
Kaysersberg's Renaissance town hall

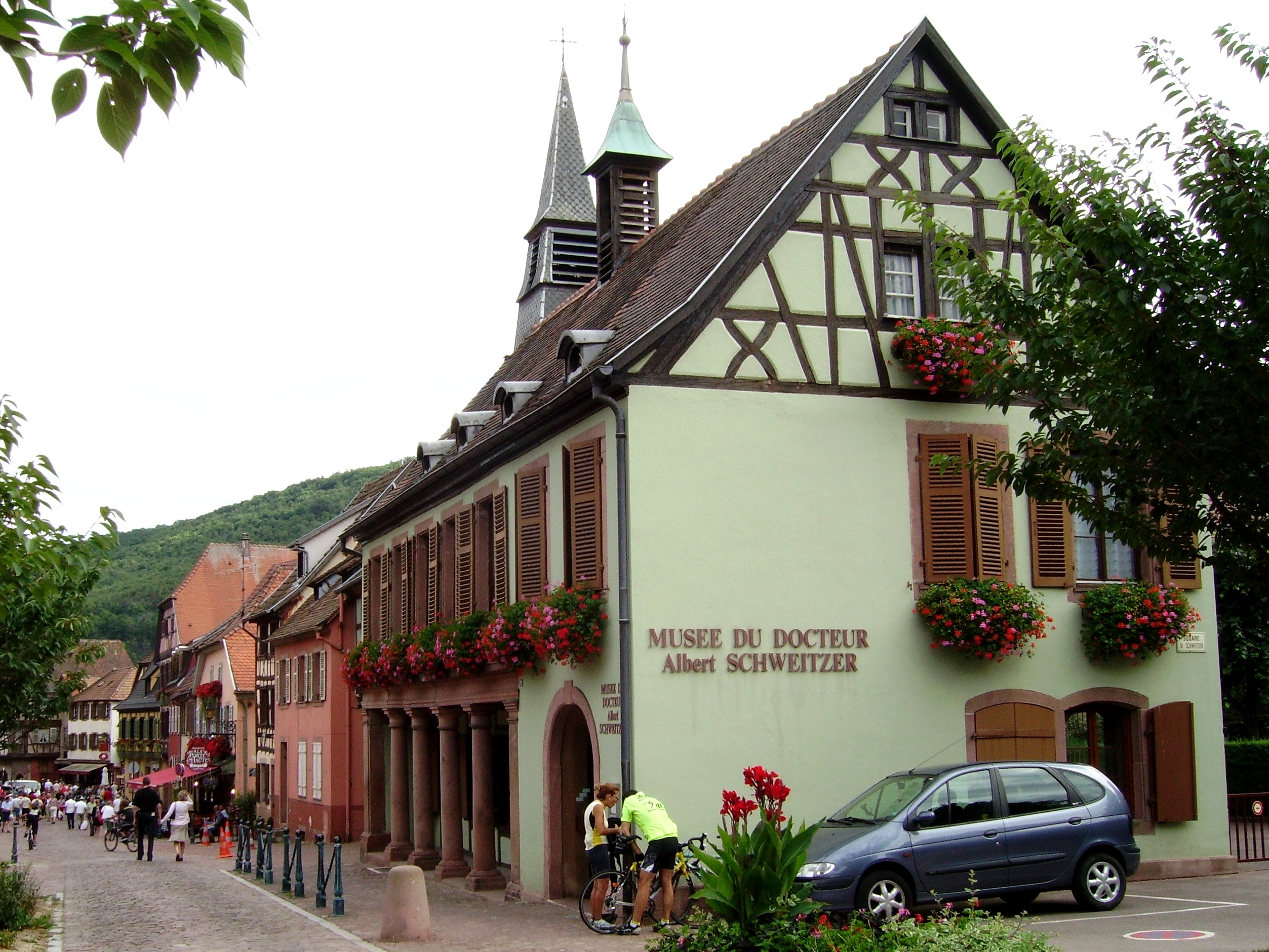
Albert Schweitzer museum

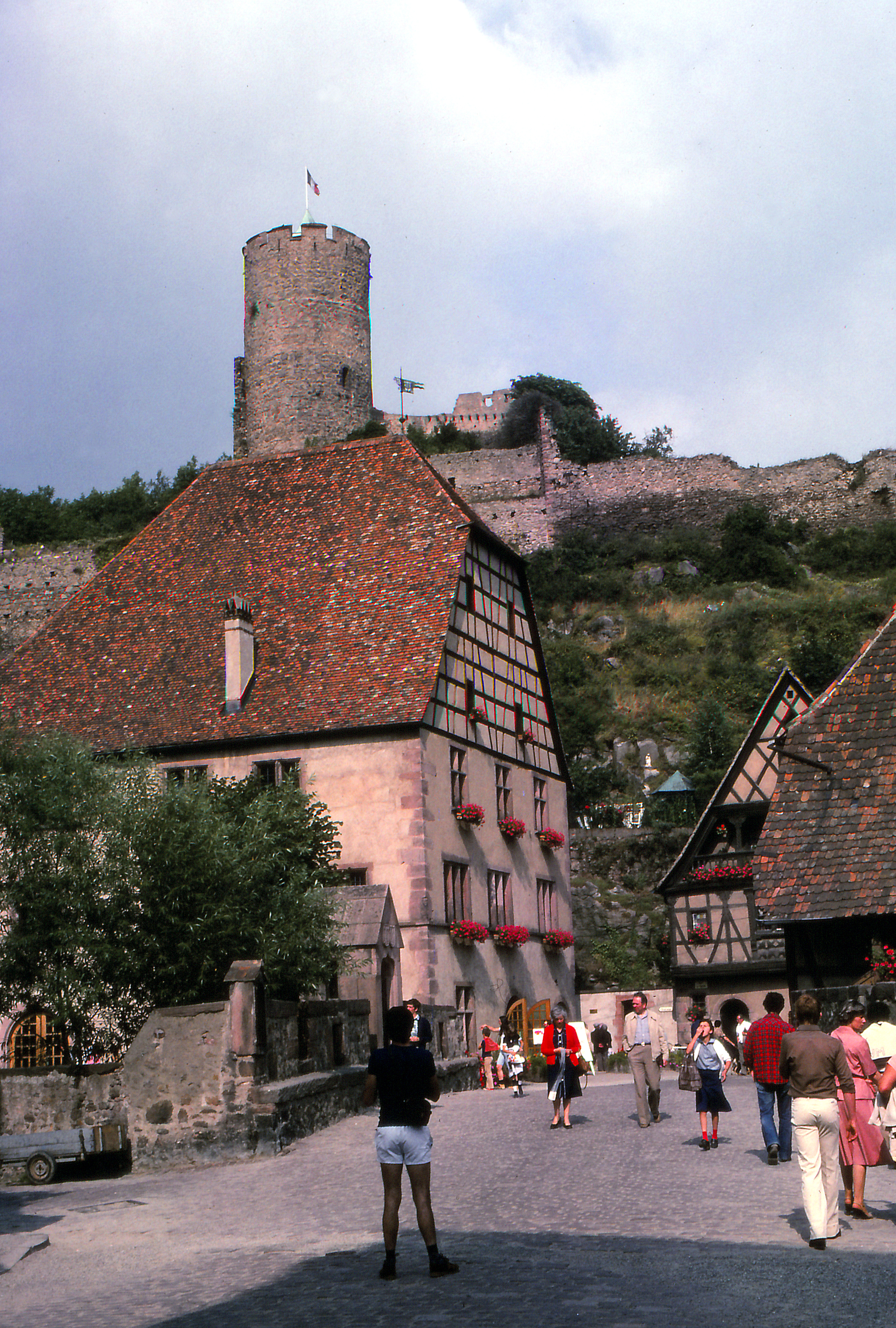
Kaysersberg is dominated by the ruins of its castle

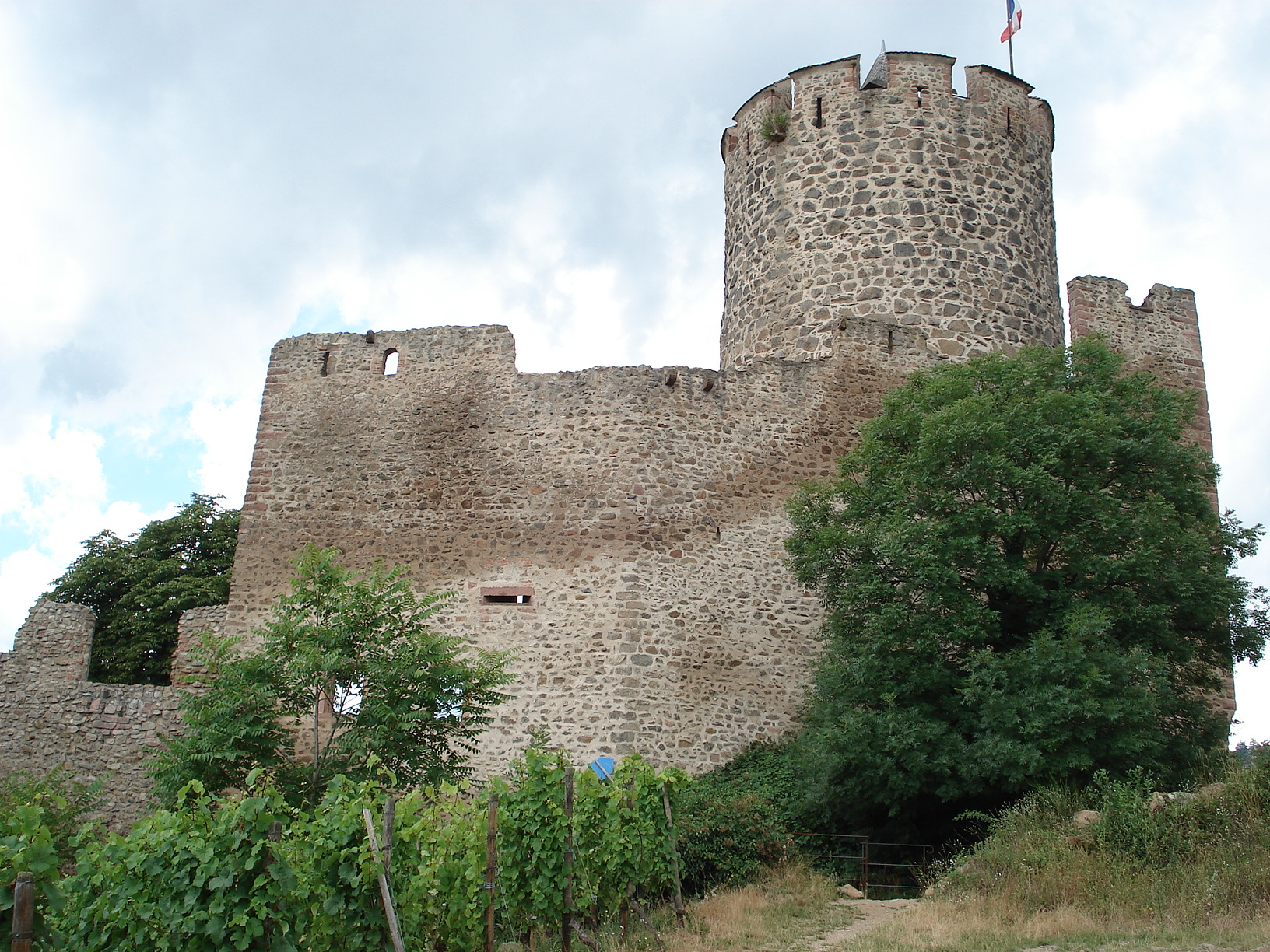
Kaysersberg Castle

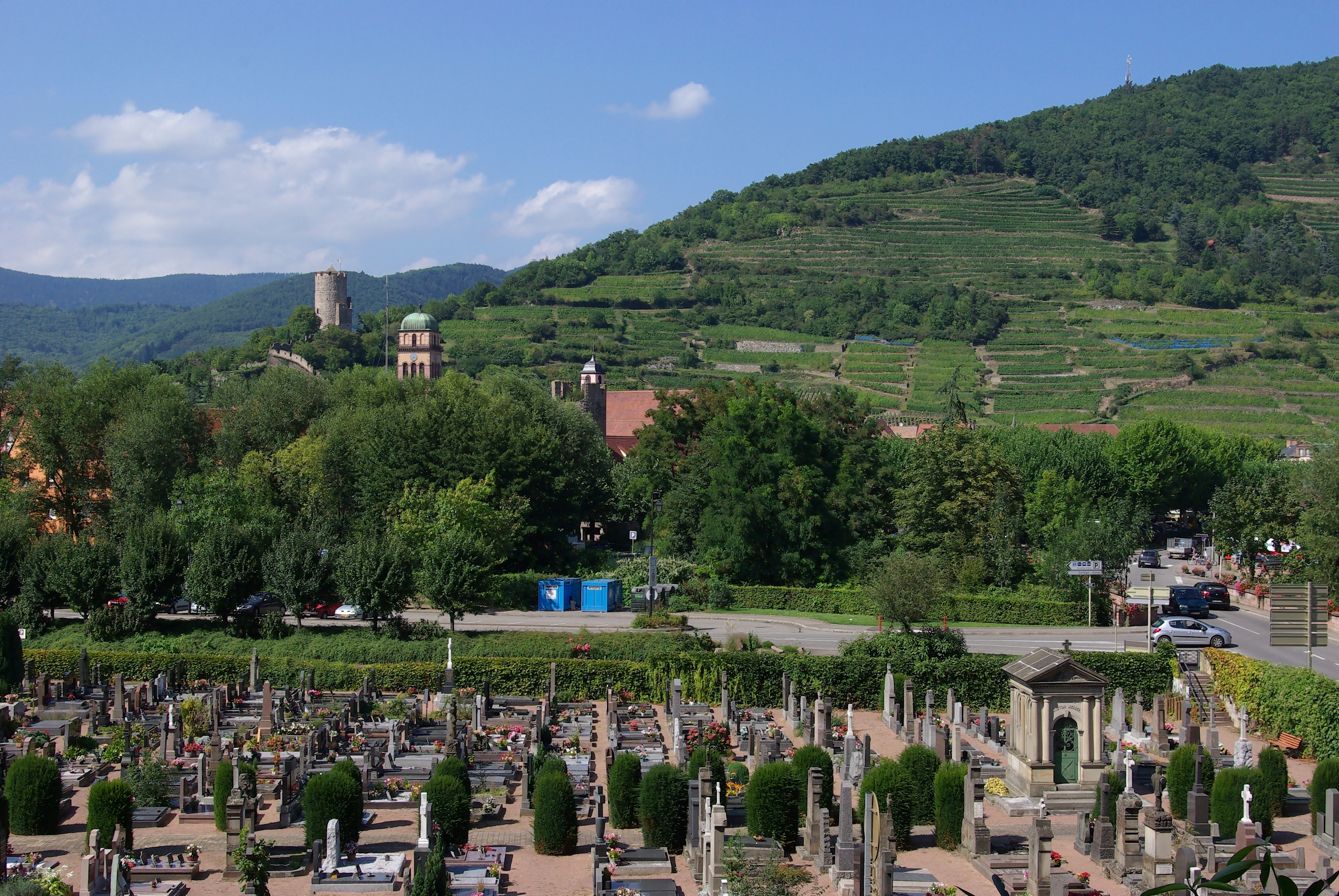
Cemetery and vineyards

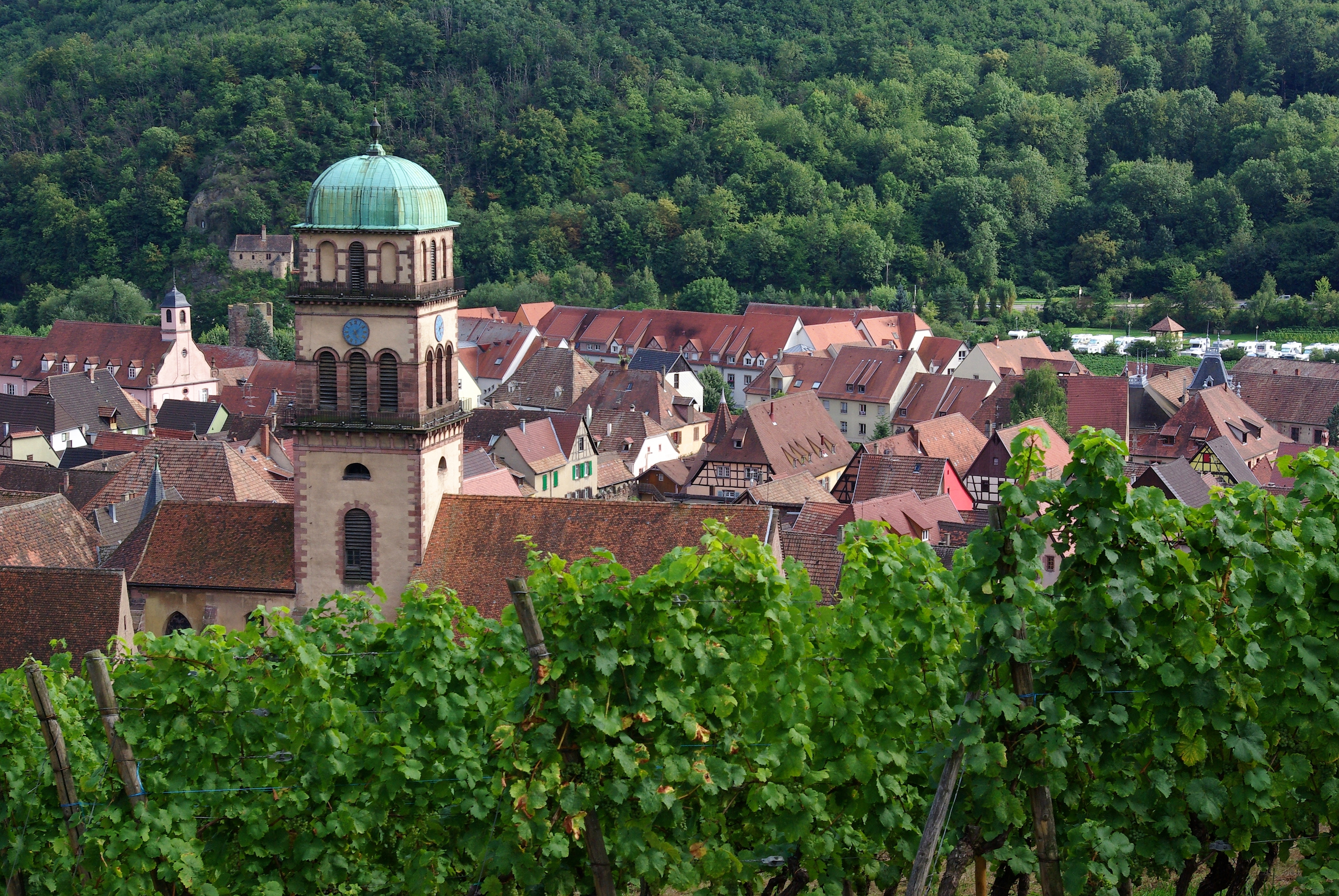
Bell tower and roofs seen from Schlossberg

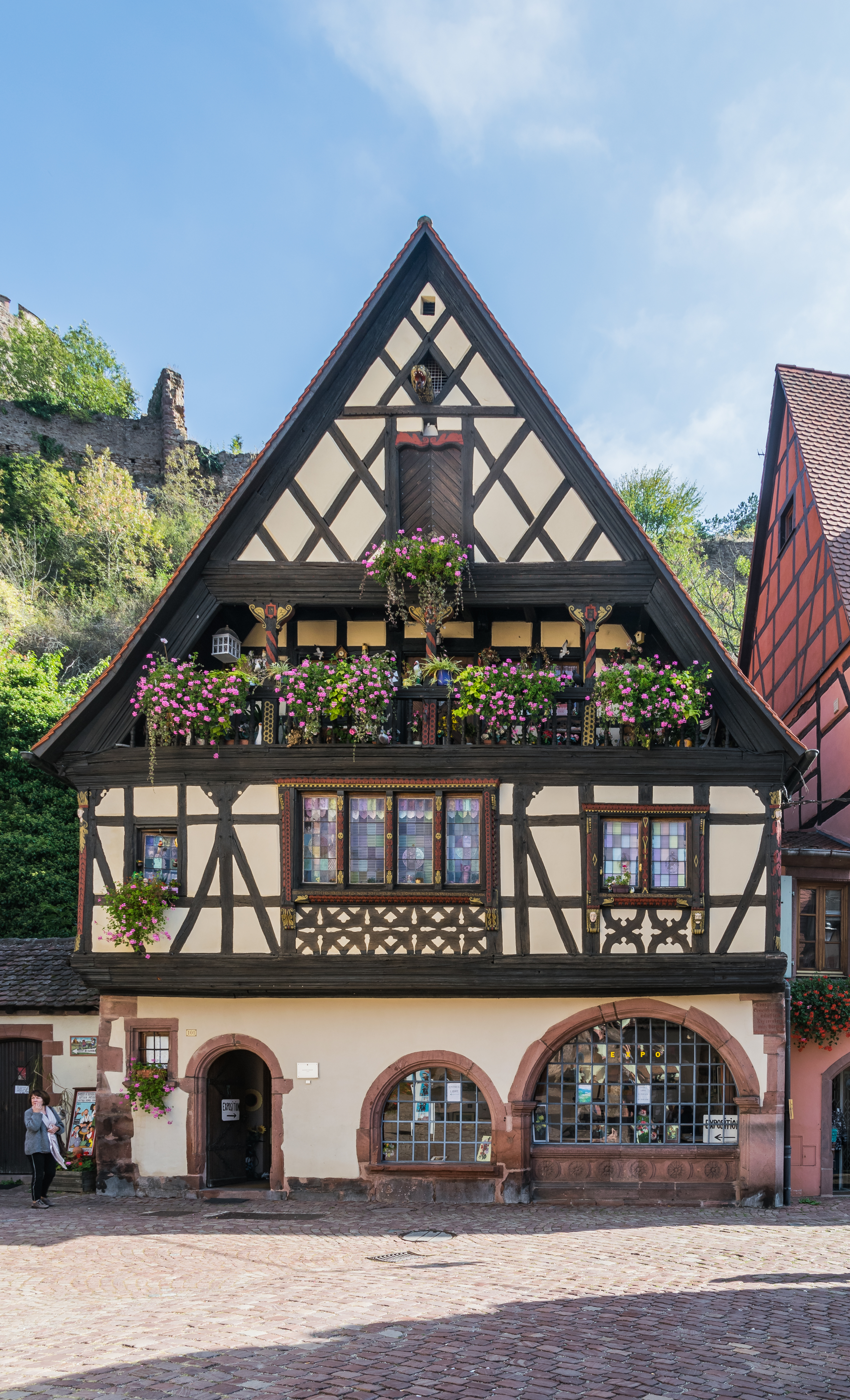
Maison Herzer

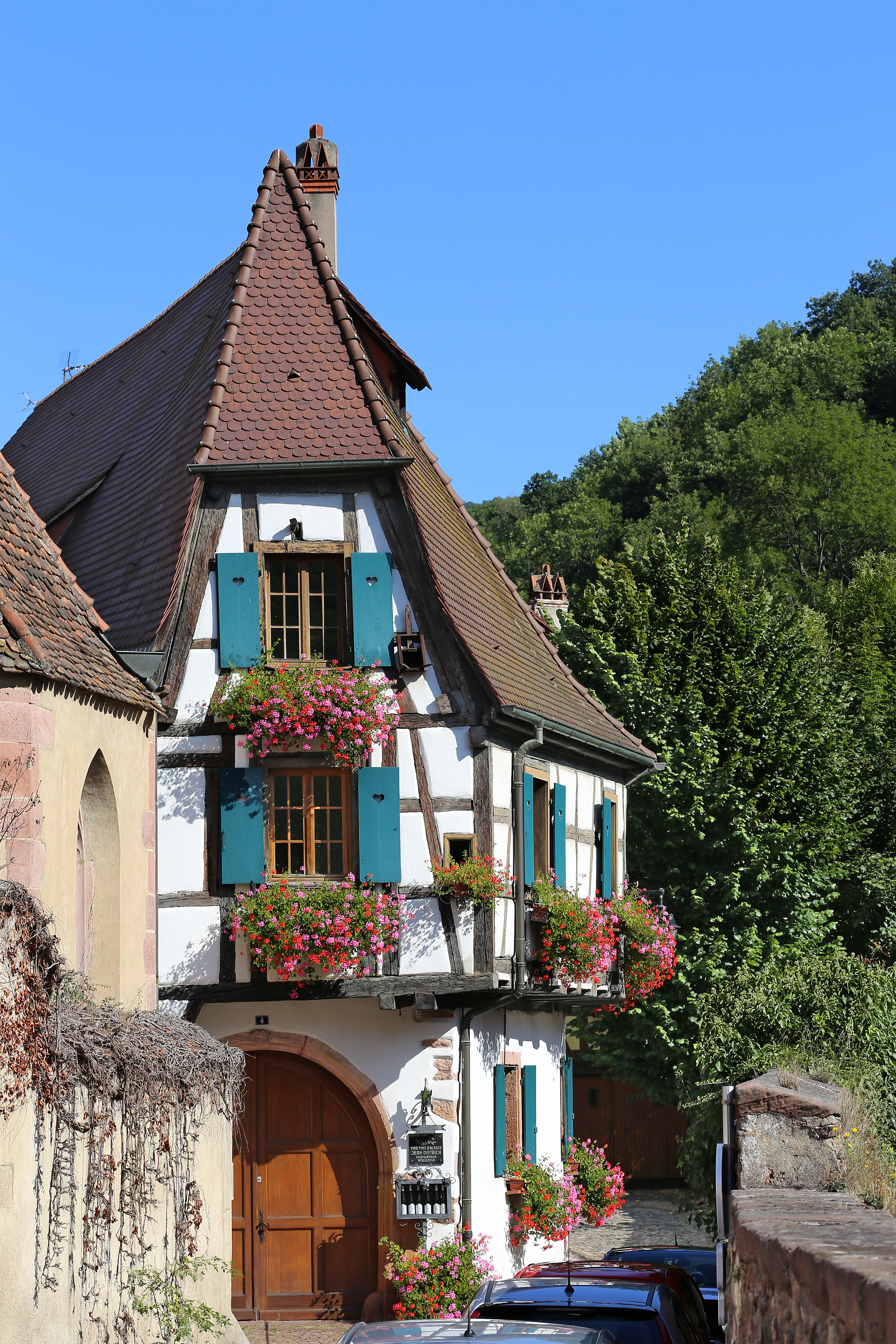
A typical building

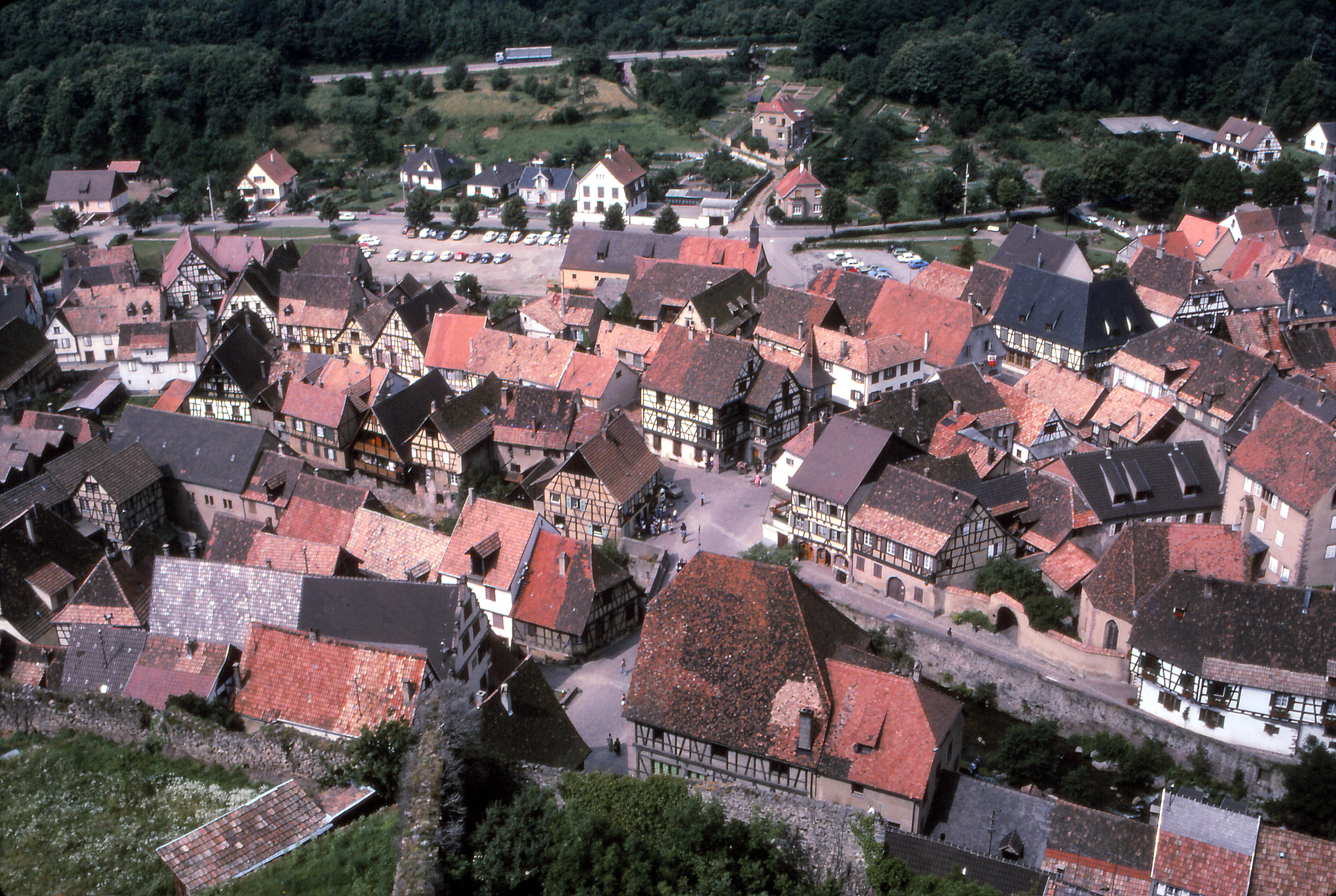
General de Gaulle Street, the Weiss River, Potiers Street and Oberthof Street seen from the castle tower.

== See also ==
- Communes of the Haut-Rhin département
