= Education in Kobe =

The city of Kobe, Japan, is home to a number of schools, both public and private. The following is a list of some of the more prominent academic institutions in Kobe:

== Universities ==
=== Public universities ===
- Kobe University
- University of Hyōgo (Prefectural university)
- Kobe City University of Foreign Studies
- Kobe City College of Nursing

=== Private universities ===
- Hyogo University of Health Sciences
- Kobe Design University
- Kobe Gakuin University
- Kobe International University
- Kobe Kaisei College (Women's university)
- Kobe Pharmaceutical University
- Kobe Reformed Theological Seminary
- Kobe Shinwa Women's University
- Kobe Shoin Women's University
- Kobe Shukugawa Gakuin University
- Kobe University of Fashion and Design
- Kobe Women's University
- Kobe Yamate University
- Konan University
- Konan Women's University
- University of Marketing and Distribution Science

== Primary and secondary schools ==
=== Public schools ===
Elementary and junior high schools are operated by the city of Kobe, while high schools are operated by the Hyogo Prefectural Board of Education .

A list of Hyogo Prefectural high schools in Japanese is here .

=== Private schools ===
Lists of private schools in Hyogo Prefecture at in Japanese.

==== International schools ====
International schools have served expatriates in Kobe since 1909.

In 1909, Deutsche Schule Kobe was founded to serve German, Austrian and German-speaking Swiss expatriates, traders and missionaries living in the Kobe area. After a long history of teaching a German curriculum, the school changed to The Primary Years Programme (PYP) in 2002. Today, Deutsche Schule Kobe/European School provides curriculum in three languages: German, English, and Japanese.

In 1913, Canadian Methodist Academy opened its doors to sixteen children. The school, renamed Canadian Academy in 1917, served children of missionary parents from grade one through high school and offered boarding facilities for students from throughout Asia. Today, the day and boarding school offers a PreK to Grade 12 education on the campus on Rokkō Island, a man-made island. The school, which is no longer affiliated with Canada or the church, is the largest school for expatriates in Kansai. The school is approved by the Japanese Ministry of Education and accredited by the Western Association of Schools and Colleges and the Council of International Schools. The school awards both the International Baccalaureate (IB) and U.S. high school diplomas.

The number of international schools burgeoned after World War II.

In 1946, St. Michael's International School was established by Anglican Bishop Michael Yashiro and Miss Leonora Lee, a British missionary. Today, the school offers a distinctive British-style primary education based on the National Curriculum of England and Wales. The school has joint accreditation from the Council of International Schools and the Western Association of Schools and Colleges.

In 1950, Lutheran International Schools, the Norwegian School, opened. Before it closed in 2005, the school accepted Norwegian, Danish, and Swedish students.

Brother Charles Fojoucyk and Brother Stephen Weber founded Marist Brothers International School in 1951 after communist authorities pressured them to leave Tientsin, China. Today, the international Montessori - Grade 12 school enrolls approximately 300 students. The school is accredited by the Western Association of Schools and Colleges.

Other international schools in Kobe include:

- Kobe Chinese School
- Kobe Korean Senior High School
- Kobe Korean Elementary and Junior High School (神戸朝鮮初中級学校)
- West Kobe Korean Elementary School (西神戸朝鮮初級学校)

== Japanese Language Schools ==
- Lexis Japan 「レクシス語学学院」
