= Jutaku =

Japanese architectural style

Jutaku or kyosho jutaku (Japanese: 狭小住宅) is a Japanese architectural style focused on delivering original, "micro-home" designs on very small sites.

== History ==
The Jutaku phenomenon rose in the 1990s as Japan's real estate sites grew increasingly smaller, both from the Japanese inheritance system and the archipelago's growing population. According to the architect Kengo Kuma, the first traces of Jutaku appear in the writings of the poet Kamo no Chōmei and the description of his own small house.

The development of smaller, capsule homes was influenced also by Japan's capsule hotel trend, launched in 1974 with the Nakagin Capsule Tower.

== Description ==
Jutaku simply means "house" in Japanese. Such residences and buildings focus on minimalist, multi-functional spaces to compensate for their small sites. They often do not blend with their urban context, making the architectural style well-suited for individualist-oriented cultures. Additionally, Jutaku structures often feature contorted geometries, advanced structural engineering, or unconventional site configurations.

According to the Japanese architect Yasuhiro Yamashita, a Jutaku house is awkward, built towards the sky, nature-sensitive, personalized, monochrome, built with reflective materials and hidden storage areas.

== Examples ==
- 4x4 house in Tarumi-ku, Kobe, designed by Ando Tadao
- Layer House, designed by Hiroaki Ohtani
- Lucky Drops, in Tokyo, designed by Yasuhiro Yamashita

== See also ==
- List of architectural styles
- Japanese architecture
