= Foreign Buyers Club =

Foreign Buyers Club was a store and mail order company on Rokko Island off Kobe, Japan that served the expat community as well as those who wanted easier access to non-Japanese good than was possible before Amazon and Costco. In addition to food, it sold personal goods and books.

== History ==
The co-op was established in 1988 by Chuck and Kelly Grafft following their 1985 arrival in Japan when friends and neighbors wanted to share in their import orders. FBC's sales and membership, respectively, peaked in 1998 and 1999, but the Great Recession and Tohoku earthquake led to a decline in the number of expats present and therefore purchasing from them.

In 2012 they were still among the largest importers of Western goods in Japan, but in that same year, Chuck Grafft was diagnosed with cancer. It closed in parts, before closing fully and permanently on December 5, 2020 citing decreased sales, the role of Amazon, COVID and the cancer diagnosis.

Grafft died in June 2021.
