= Island Kitaguchi Station =

Railway station in Kobe, Hyogo prefecture, Japan

Island Kitaguchi Station アイランド北口駅
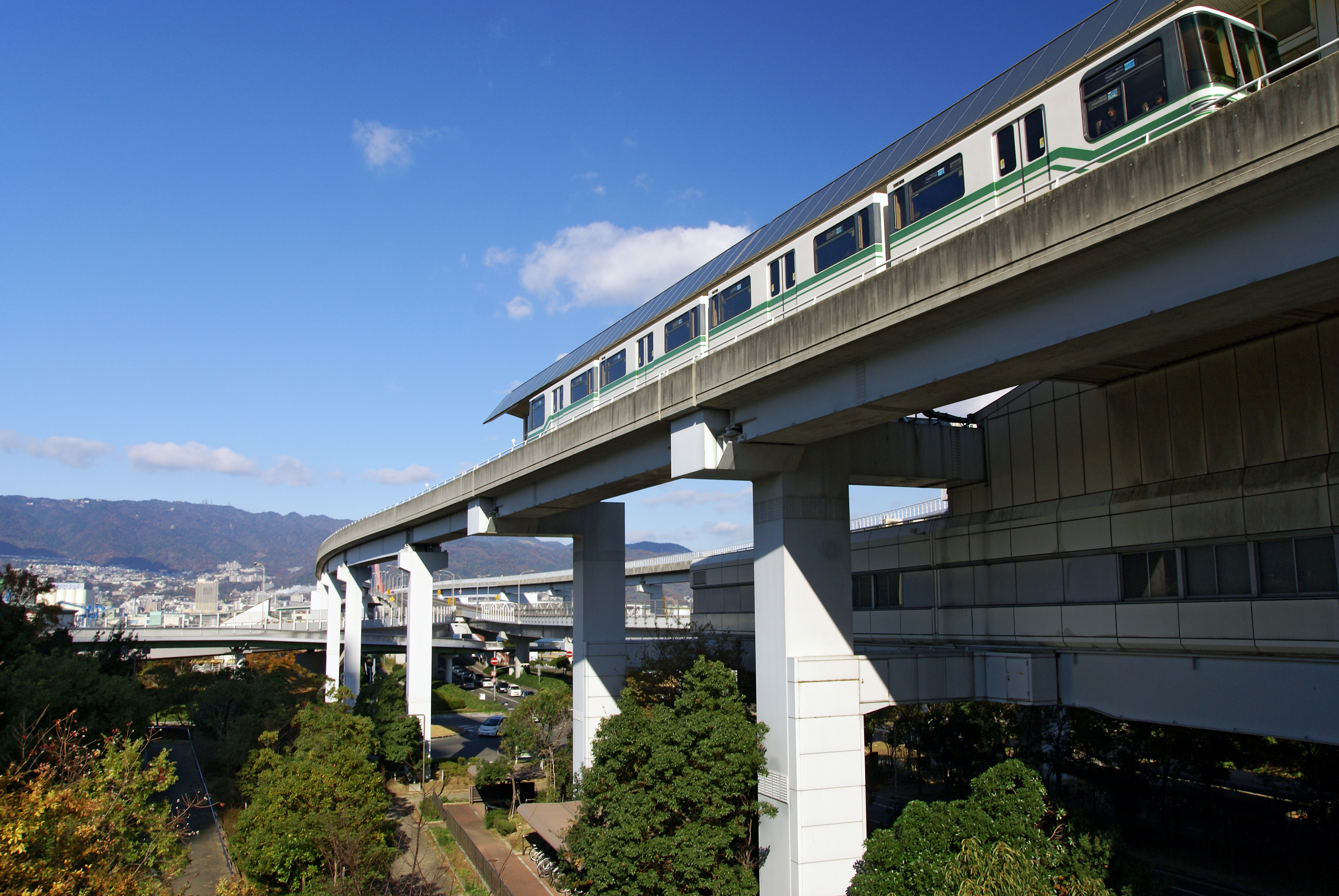

General information
- Location: 1 Kōyōchō Naka, Higashinada, Kobe, Hyōgo （兵庫県神戸市東灘区向洋町中一丁目） Japan
- Coordinates: 34.6933°N 135.2687°E
- Operator: Kobe New Transit
- Line: Rokko Island Line

Other information
- Station code: R04

History
- Opened: February 21, 1990
Location

Island Kitaguchi Station (アイランド北口駅, Airando-Kitaguchi-eki) is a railway station on the Rokko Island Line in Kobe, Hyōgo Prefecture, Japan, operated by Kobe New Transit.

== Lines ==
Island Kitaguchi Station is served by the Rokko Island Line automated guideway transit, and is located 3.5 kilometers from the terminus of the line at Sumiyoshi Station.

== Station layout ==
Island Kitaguchi Station has a single island platform.

=== Platforms ===
1	■ Rokko Island Line	for Marine Park
2	■ Rokko Island Line	for Sumiyoshi

== Adjacent stations ==
«	Service	»
Rokko Island Line (R04)
Minami-Uozaki (R03)	-	Island Center (R05)

== History ==
Island Kitaguchi Station opened on February 21, 1990.
