= Jazz piano =

Techniques pianists use when playing jazz

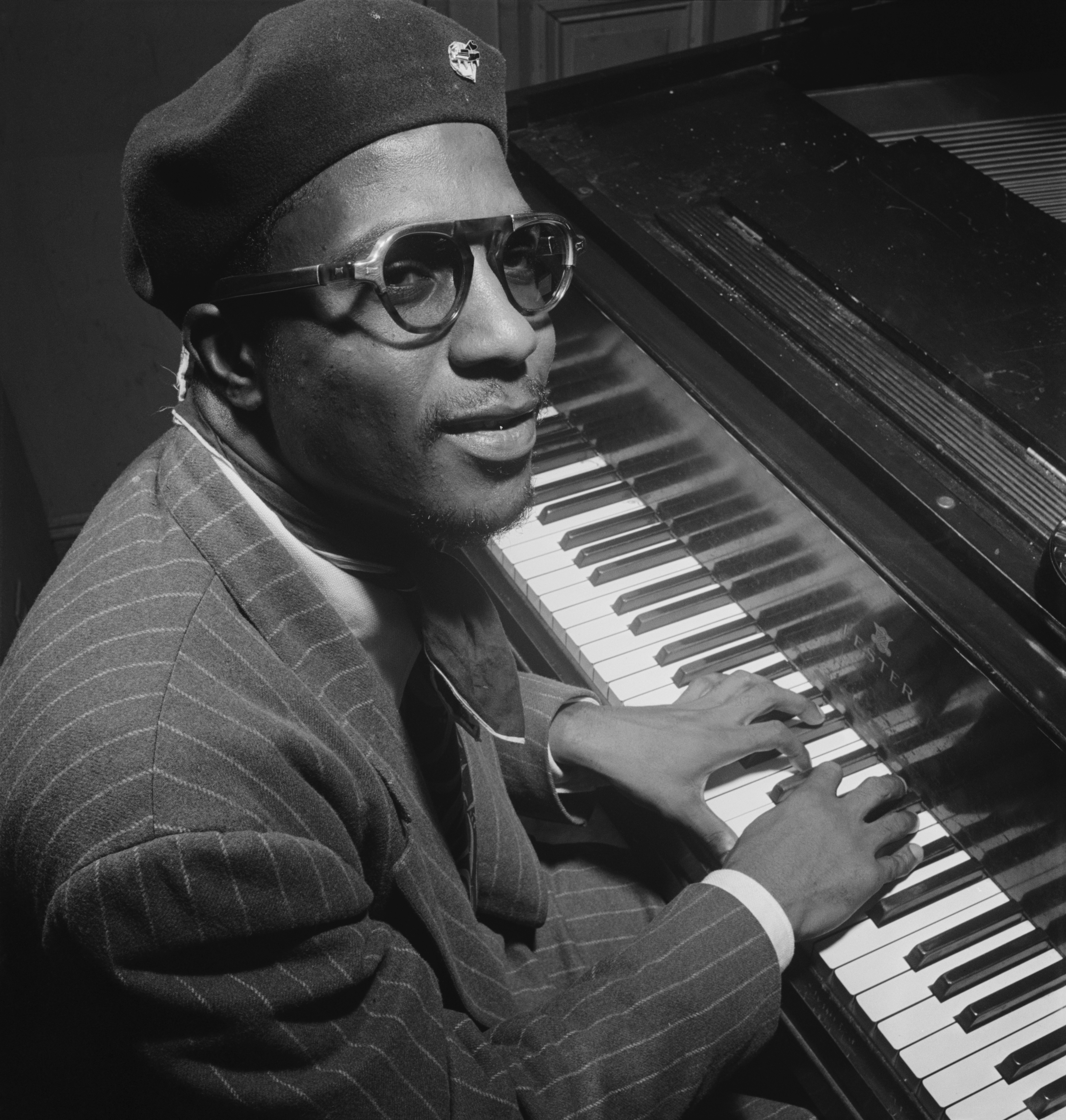
Thelonious Monk in 1947

Jazz piano is a collective term for the techniques pianists use when playing jazz. The piano has been an integral part of the jazz idiom since its inception, in both solo and ensemble settings. Its role is multifaceted due largely to the instrument's combined melodic and harmonic capabilities. For this reason it is an important tool of jazz musicians and composers for teaching and learning jazz theory and set arrangement, regardless of their main instrument. By extension the phrase 'jazz piano' can refer to similar techniques on any keyboard instrument.

Along with the guitar, vibraphone, and other keyboard instruments, the piano is one of the instruments in a jazz combo that can play both single notes and chords rather than only single notes as does the saxophone or trumpet.

== Beginning ==
A new style known as "stride" or "Harlem stride" emerged during the 1920s, predominantly in New York, United States. James P. Johnson was a prominent proponent. The left hand was used to establish rhythm while the right hand improvised melodies.

== Technique ==
=== Learning jazz piano ===
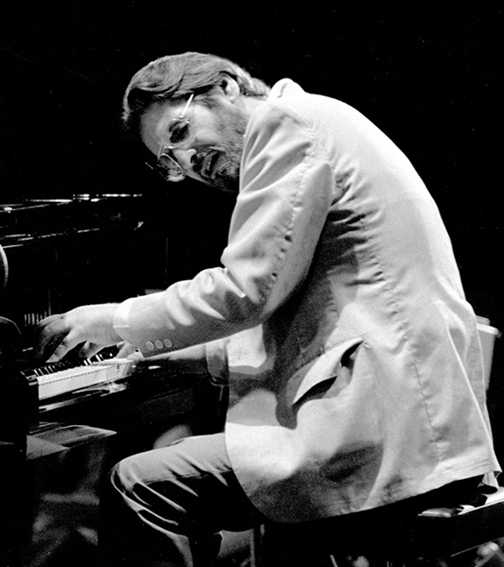
Bill Evans performing at the Montreux Jazz Festival in 1978

Mastering the various chord voicings—simple to advanced—is the first building block of learning jazz piano. Jazz piano technique uses all the chords found in Western art music, such as major, minor, augmented, diminished, seventh, diminished seventh, sixth, minor seventh, major seventh, suspended fourth, and so on. A second key skill is learning to play with a swing rhythm and "feel". In jazz, the roots are usually omitted from keyboard voicings, as this task is left to the double bass player. Jazz pianists also make extensive use of chord "extensions", such as adding the ninth, eleventh or thirteenth scale degree to the chord. In some cases, these extensions may be "altered" i.e. sharpened or flattened, as in the case of a "sharp 11" chord.

The next step is learning to improvise melodic lines using scales and chord tones. This ability is perfected after long experience, including much practice, which internalizes the physical skills of playing and the technical elements of harmony, and it requires a great natural 'ear' for extemporaneous music-making. When jazz pianists improvise, they use the scales, modes, and arpeggios associated with the chords in a tune's chord progression. The approach to improvising has changed since the earliest eras of jazz piano. During the swing era, many soloists improvised "by ear" by embellishing the melody with ornaments and passing notes. However, during the bebop era, the rapid tempo and complicated chord progressions made it increasingly harder to play "by ear." Along with other improvisers, such as saxes and guitar players, bebop-era jazz pianists began to improvise over the chord changes using scales (whole tone scale, chromatic scale, etc.) and arpeggios.

=== Styles ===
Jazz piano (the technique) and the instrument itself offer soloists an exhaustive number of choices. One may play the bass register in an ostinato pattern, popular in boogie-woogie style, where the left hand repeats a phrase numerous times throughout a song, as performed by Rob Agerbeek in "Boogie Woogie Stomp". The left hand can also be played as a melodic counterline that emulates the walking of an upright bass. In stride piano, (similar to the earlier ragtime) the left hand rapidly plays alternate positions between notes in the bass register and chords in the tenor register, while the right hand plays melody and improvises, as performed in George Gershwin's "Liza". The right hand may play melodic lines, or harmonic content, chordally or in octaves. It may also be played in lockstep with the left hand, using a double melody block chord called "locked-hand" voicing, or Shearing voicing—a technique popularized, though not invented, by the pianist and set leader George Shearing.

=== Ensemble role ===
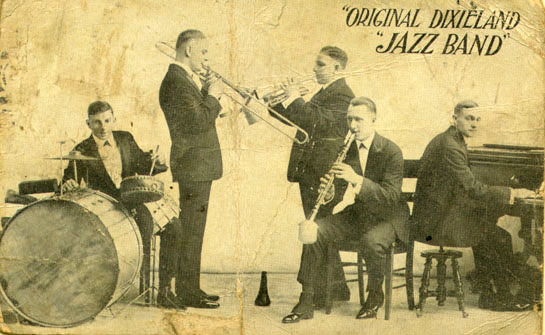
The Original Dixieland Jazz Band, with Henry Ragas on piano

Jazz piano has played a leading role in developing the sound of jazz. Early on, Black jazz musicians created ragtime on the piano. As the genre progressed, the piano was usually featured in the rhythm section of a band, which was typically configured as one or more of piano, guitar, bass, or drums, or other instruments, such as the vibraphone.

Over time, playing piano-accompaniment in ensemble sets, and then bands, changed from primarily time-keeping (consisting of repetitive left-hand figures) to a more flexible role. Ultimately, the skilled pianist was free both to lead and to answer the instrumental soloist, using both short and sustained, chordal and melodic, fragments—a technique known as comping. Good comping musicians were capable of many and different chord voicings, so to match the various moods the different soloists were aiming for. In the early days, not all leading pianists were concerned to provide comping. Others—notably Duke Ellington, who became famous during the Harlem Renaissance at the Cotton Club—earned great esteem among band members as well as other musicians. Ellington comped enthusiastically in support of the soloist and did much to develop the technique.

Jazz piano moved away from playing lead melody to providing foundation for song sets; soon, skilled jazz pianists were performing as soloists. In the 1940s and 1950s, a number of great piano players emerged. Pianists like Thelonious Monk and Bud Powell helped create and establish the sound of bebop. Bill Evans built upon the style of Powell while adding a distinct classical influence to his playing, while Oscar Peterson pushed rhythmic variations and was influenced by the style of Art Tatum, Teddy Wilson and Nat King Cole. Wynton Kelly, Red Garland, Herbie Hancock, and Keith Jarrett were also exceptional pianists who played with Miles Davis. Tommy Flanagan was featured by John Coltrane on his hit album Giant Steps. McCoy Tyner is also an influential player who played with Coltrane.

== See also ==
- List of jazz pianists
- Swing (jazz performance style), a term of praise for playing that has a strong rhythmic "groove" or drive

== Sources ==
- Taylor, Billy (1983). Jazz Piano: A Jazz History. Dubuque, Iowa: W.C. Brown Co. ISBN 978-0697099594. Adapted from Taylor’s National Public Radio series.
- Mark Levine: The Jazz Piano Book. A "how to" book on the subject.
- Randy Halberstadt: Metaphors For The Musician. Insights into almost every aspect of jazz piano.
- Luke Gillespie: Stylistic II/V7/I Voicings For Keyboardists. Covers all styles of comping, from basic and fundamental approaches to modern.
- Hal Galper: Forward Motion. An approach to jazz phrasing.
- Riccardo Scivales: Jazz Piano: The Left Hand (Bedford Hills, New York: Ekay Music, 2005). A method covering all the left-hand techniques used in jazz piano (and also a study of the history of the left hand in jazz piano), with hundreds of musical examples.
- David Berkman: The Jazz Musician's Guide to Creative Practicing. Covers the problems of jazz improvisational practice with a focus on the piano, but for all instruments. (Also, it is entertaining and humorous.)
- "Duke Ellington Biography." Duke Ellington Biography. N.p., n.d. Web. 13 November 2014.
- Dupuis, Robert. "Contemporary Musicians: Art Tatum." Encyclopedia. N.p., 1997. Web. 15 November 2014
