= Norwegian School (Kobe) =

International school in Kobe, Japan

The Norwegian School
- ルーテル国際学園ノルウェー学校
- Kobe; Japan

Information
- Other name: Lutheran International Schools
- Established: 1950
- Closed: 2005
- Grades: 1 - 9

Lutheran International Schools (The Norwegian School) (ルーテル国際学園ノルウェー学校) was a Norwegian international school in Kobe, Japan. It was previously in Tarumi-ku, and it later was located on Rokko Island in Higashinada-ku. The school served grades 1-9. It accepted Danish and Swedish students in addition to Norwegian ones.

== History ==
The school first opened in 1950. Its boarding facility's population grew after the school opened, and as of 1983 most students stayed in a boarding facility. In 1983 the school had 37 students. The school moved to Rokkō Island in 1990. By 2005, after a decline in the student body, the school had a grand total of nine students. The school closed in 2005, and the final graduation ceremony was held on 17 June of that year. Canadian Academy, an international school next door, purchased the property at the end of 2005. Canadian Academy's Early Learning and Activities Center opened on the site in January 2008.

== See also ==
- Education in Kobe
