= 4x4 house =

Building designed by Japanese architect Tadao Ando

The 4x4 house is a private residential house designed by the Japanese architect Tadao Ando and located in Tarumi-ku, Kobe, Hyogo, on the coast of the Inland Sea in Japan.

== History ==
The 4x4 house plan was built in the aftermath of the Great Hanshin earthquake. The architecture magazine Brutus invited its readers to submit development ideas to a selection of architects. The latter picked this sea-front site idea. The redevelopment project was comprised or narrow and chaotic strips of lands. The house was built in 2003.

The lot, about 65 square meters, was the property of Yoshinari Nakata. 1/4 of the land is regularly flooded by seawater. Nakata was the reader who suggested his own lot to the Brutus call-to-submission. Tadao Ando was interested by the site's limitations and its closeness to the 1995 earthquake.

An identical house (4x4 house II) was commissioned to Ando Tadao by the neighbor of the adjacent plot (built in 2004), but the two twin houses were built using different materials. The 4x4 has a staircase and is made of concrete, and its copy has an elevator and is made of wood (laminated pine from Oregon and Paulownia wood). Using different materials was a suggestion made by the architect. The architect has often worked on twin and/or dualistic structures (and he has a twin brother). This brutalist modernist house on the beach is close to surrealistic.

The architect has also published an addition proposition for the house, a straight concrete staircase descending from the house to the sandy beach, with a square concrete patio at the base of the stairs that sinks under water when the sea is at full tide.

Before the construction of the 4x4 house, the authorities did not consider this strip of land to be constructible.

== Description ==
The 4x4 house is a four story tower with 4m x 4m dimensions (13x13 feet) in a 16.5 foot-square space. The overall shape and location of the building is evocative of a watchtower.

The house is encased in concrete and deep in the ground to resist to lateral forces. The bedrooms are on the intermediary floors, and the kitchen and living room are on the top floor. The organization of the house follows the principles of the Ken organisational framework, and is often mentioned as an example of Jutaku houses.

The last floor is a 4x4m cube that is displaced exactly 1m from the vertical axis of the building in the direction of the water, giving a sensation of being at sea when looking at the horizon. The house has a direct view on the Akashi Kaikyō Bridge. Located next to a rail track, a major road, a sea corridor, and an airport, the house is very noisy.
