= Minami-Uozaki Station =

Railway station in Kobe, Hyogo prefecture, Japan

Coordinates: 34.7068°N 135.2677°E

Minami-Uozaki Station 南魚崎駅
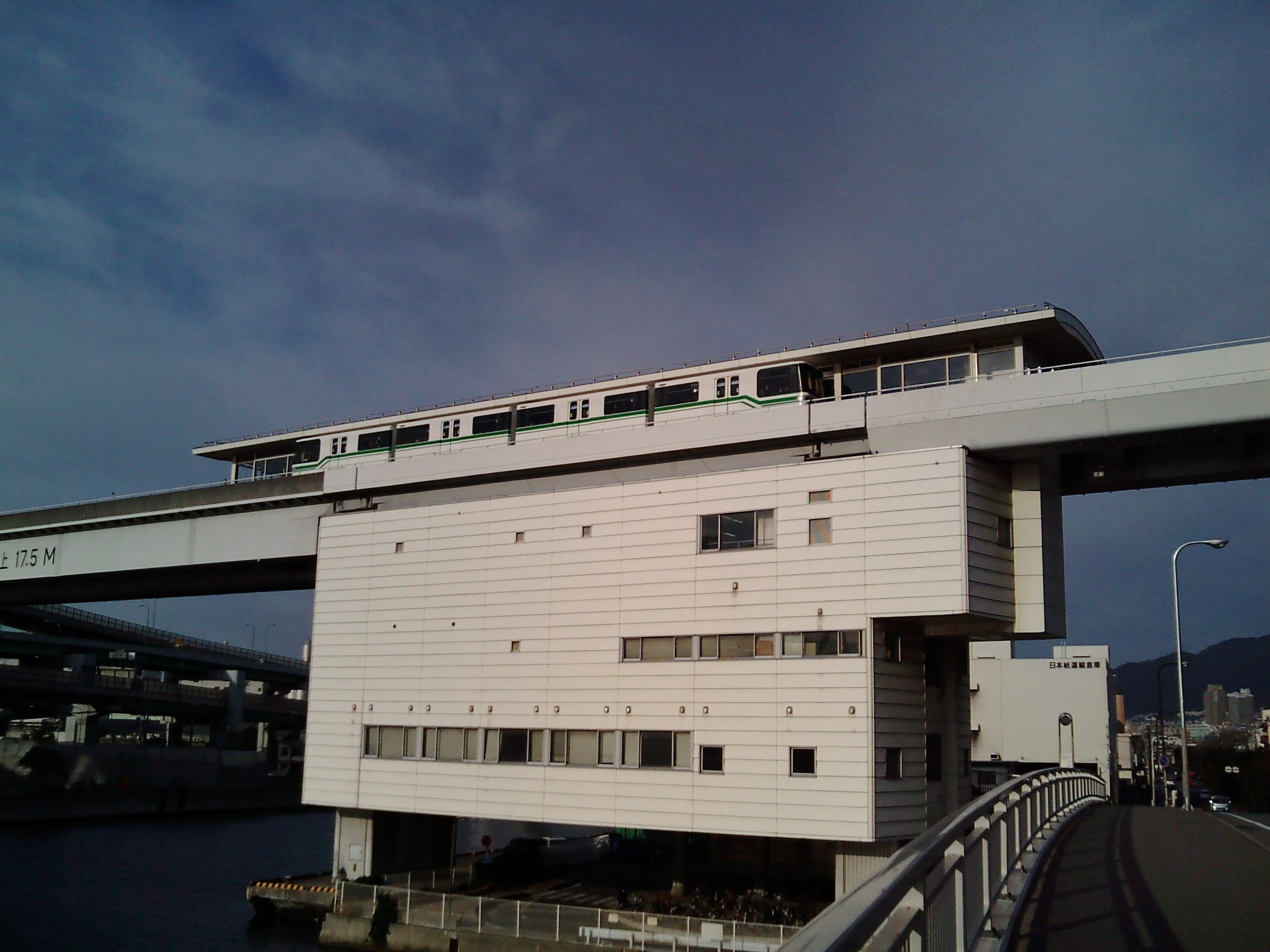

General information
- Location: Uozaki Nishimachi, Higashinada, Kobe, Hyōgo （兵庫県神戸市東灘区魚崎西町） Japan
- Operator: Kobe New Transit
- Line: Rokko Island Line

Other information
- Station code: R03

History
- Opened: February 21, 1990
Location

Minami-Uozaki Station (南魚崎駅, Minami-Uozaki eki) is a railway station on the Rokko Island Line in Kobe, Hyōgo Prefecture, Japan, operated by Kobe New Transit.

== Lines ==
Minami-Uozaki Station is served by the Rokko Island Line automated guideway transit, and is located 2.0 kilometers from the terminus of the line at Sumiyoshi Station.

== Station layout ==
Minami-Uozaki Station has a single island platform.

=== Platforms ===
1	■ Rokko Island Line	for Marine Park
2	■ Rokko Island Line	for Sumiyoshi

== Adjacent stations ==
«	Service	»
Rokko Island Line (R03)
Uozaki (R02)	-	Island Kitaguchi (R04)

== History ==
Minami-Uozaki Station opened on February 21, 1990.
