= Kobe College of Liberal Arts =

Former higher education institution in Akashi, Japan

Coordinates: 34°40′28″N 134°58′10″E

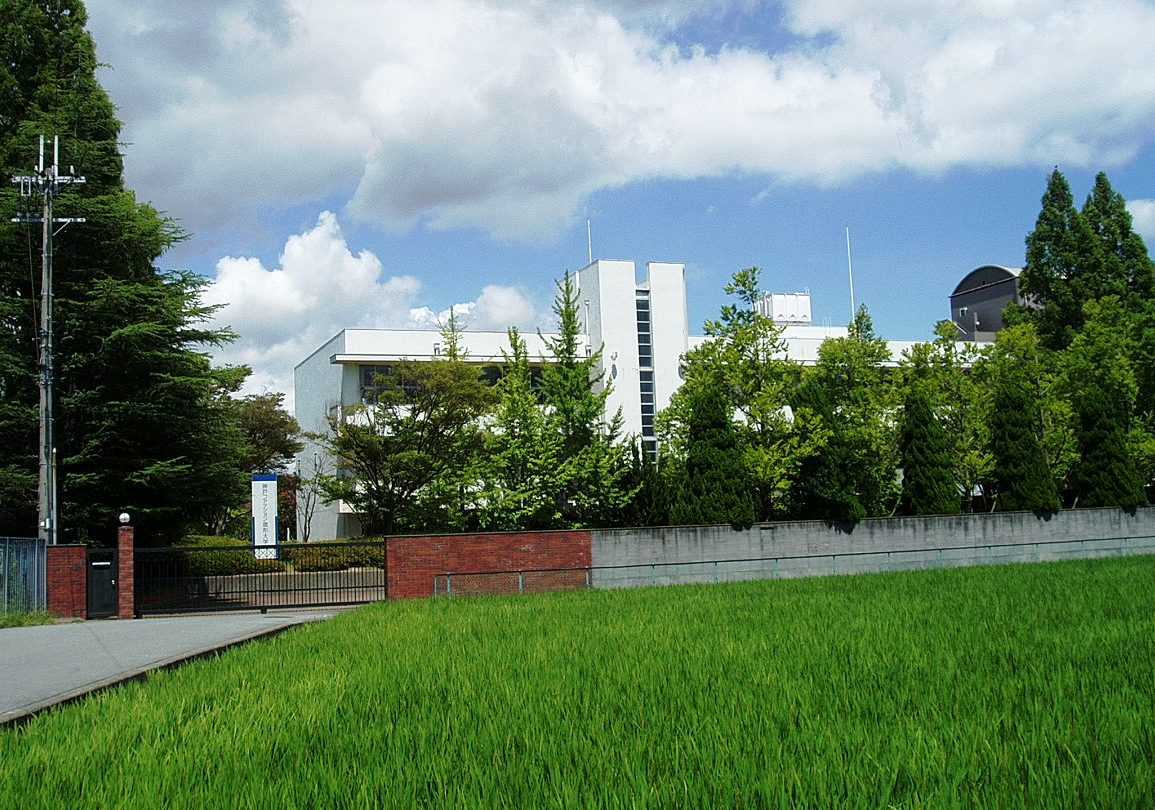
Main gate

Kobe College of Liberal Arts (神戸文化短期大学, Kōbe bunka tanki daigaku) was a private junior college in Akashi, Hyogo, Japan.

== History ==
The college was founded in 1967 as Akashi Women's Junior College (明石女子短期大学) with the Department of Clothing Science. It became coeducational in 1969 and was renamed Akashi Junior College (明石短期大学) . In 1970 it added the departments of Design and Liberal Arts. After the Michiyo Okabe (岡部 三千代 Okabe Michiyo, 18-year-old Akashi Junior College girl) nude murder case, it was renamed Kobe College of Liberal Arts in 1990.

In 2008 the college was merged into Kobe University of Fashion and Design and renamed Kobe College of Fashion and Design (神戸ファッション造形大学短期大学部).

== See also ==
- Junior college
