= Tarumi-ku =

Ward of Kobe in Kansai, Japan

Coordinates: 34°38′43″N 135°02′59″E

Location of Tarumi-ku in Kobe

Tarumi (垂水区, Tarumi-ku) is one of nine wards of Kobe, Japan. It has an area of 26.89 km^{2}, and a population of 219,958 (2008).

Tarumi is a suburban area in western Kobe, providing residential towns for commuters to downtown Kobe and even Osaka. The Akashi Kaikyō Bridge starts from this ward toward Awaji Island.

The area belonged to the Akashi Domain of Harima Province until the end of the Edo period. In 1899, the village of Tarumi was formed within Akashi District. In 1928, Tarumi village was renamed as a town. In July 1941, Tarumi merged into Kobe and became a part of Suma ward.

The modern Tarumi ward was formed from the area of the former Tarumi town in 1946. In 1947 a further seven villages from Akashi District merged into Kobe and became a part of Tarumi until 1982 when they were split off into the separate Nishi ward.

There is a port in the area, which is used by the coastal fishing industry, which is famous for ikanago (玉筋魚) (Ammodytes personatus, the Pacific sandeel—a species of sand lance) and sushi.

== Education ==
Kobe Korean Senior High School, a North Korea-aligned school, is in Tarumi-ku.

Before its 1990 move to Rokkō Island, Norwegian School was in Tarumi-ku.
