= Rokkō Island =

Man-made island in Kobe, Japan

Native name: 六甲アイランド
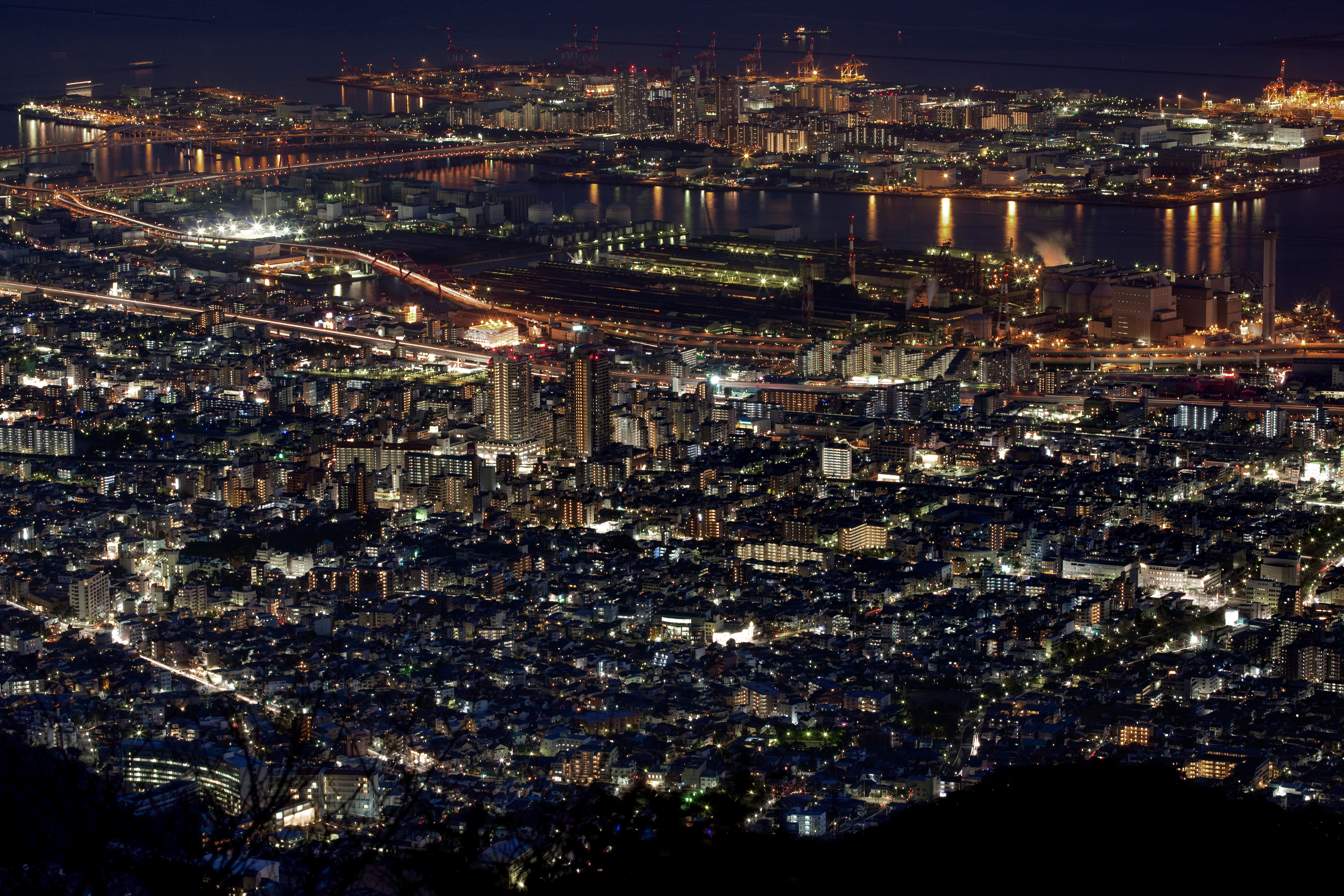
- Rokkō Island viewed from Mount Rokkō

- Location within Hyōgo Prefecture

Geography
- Location: Osaka Bay
- Coordinates: 34°41′N 135°16′E
- Total islands: 1
- Area: 5.80 km^{2} (2.24 sq mi)
- Length: 3.4 km (2.11 mi)
- Width: 2.0 km (1.24 mi)
- Highest elevation: 2 m (7 ft)

Administration
- Japan
- Ward: Higashinada-ku
- City: Kobe
- Prefecture: Hyōgo

Demographics
- Population: 19,253 (30 April 2017)

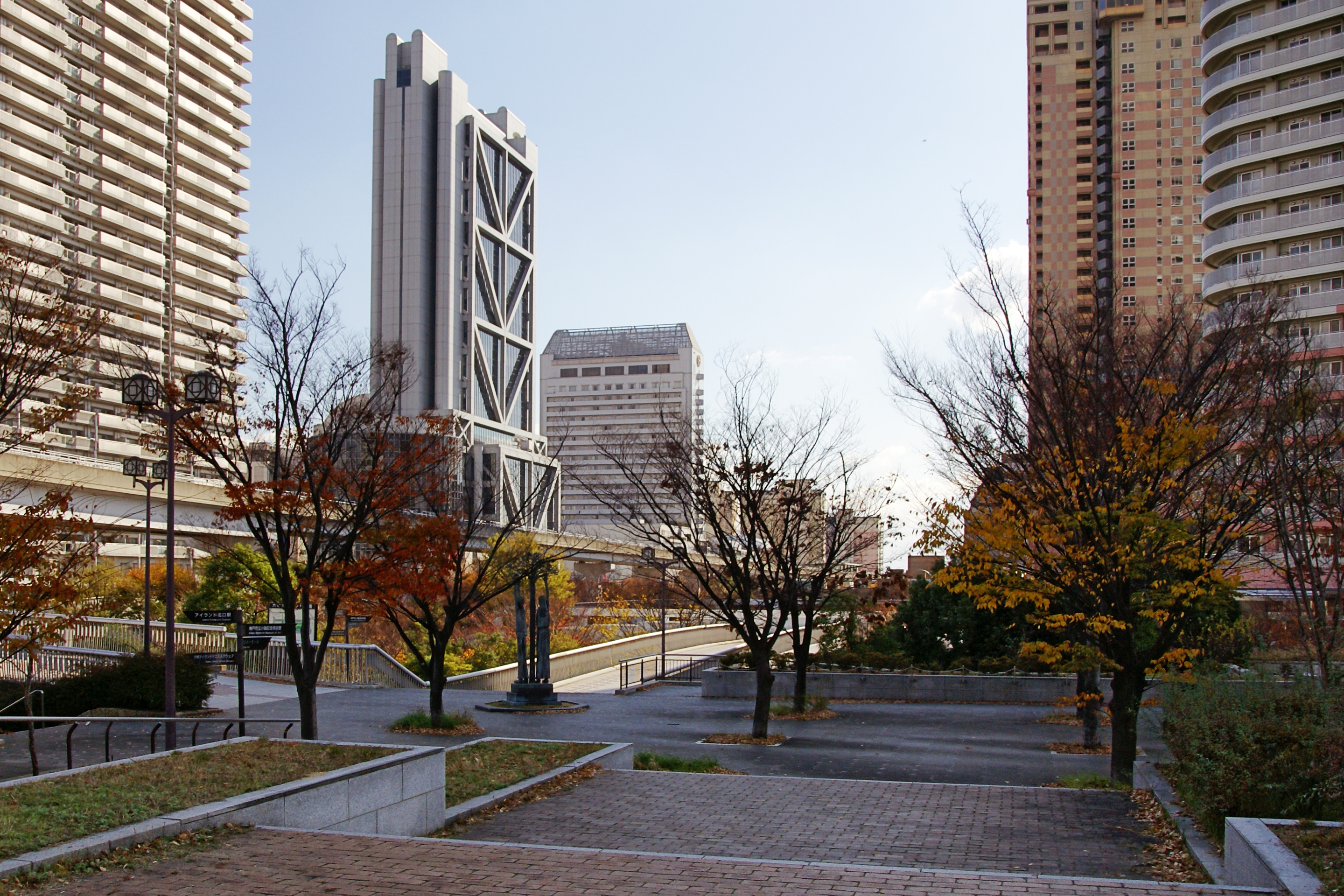
Asia One Center

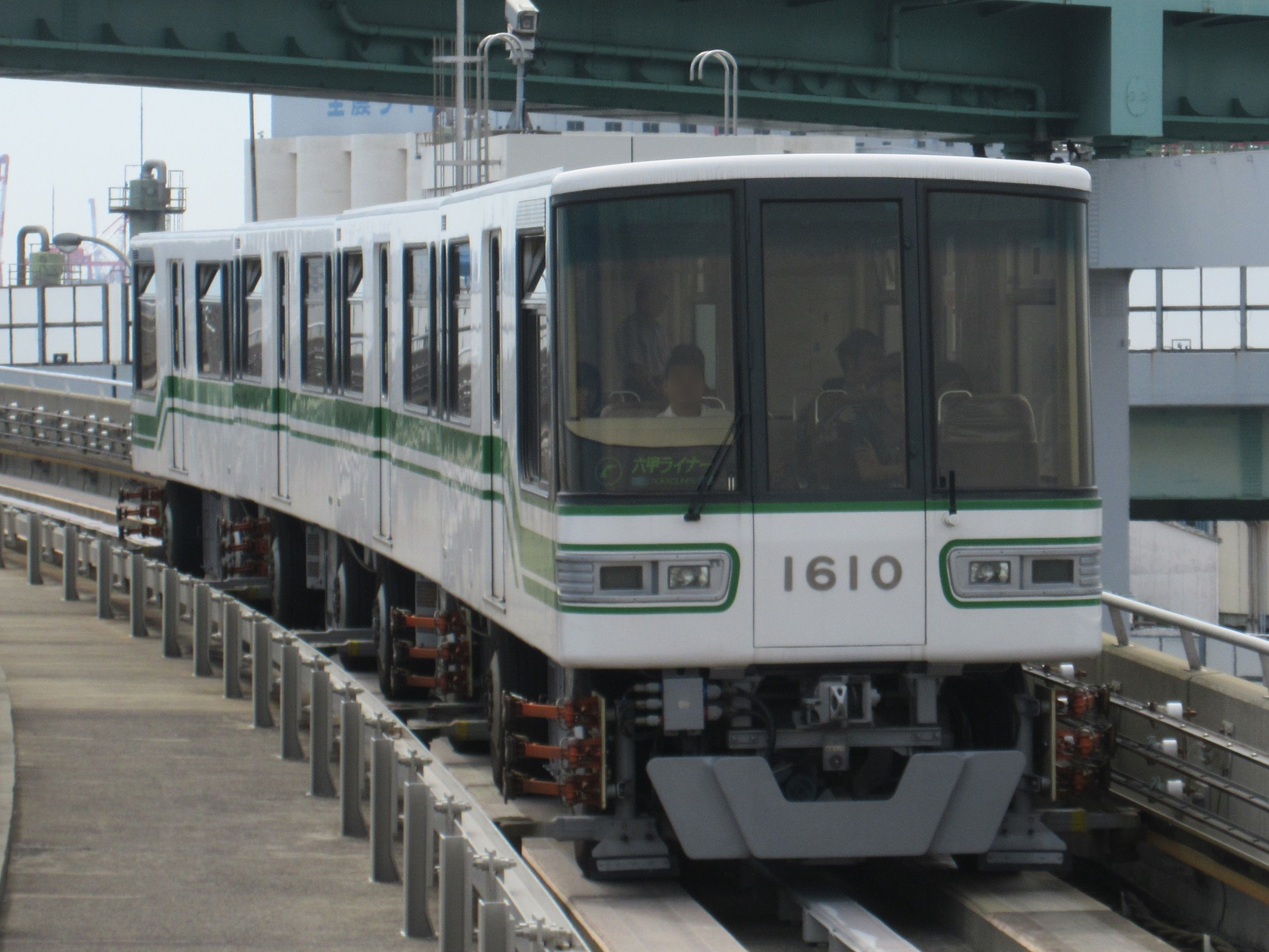
Rokkō Liner

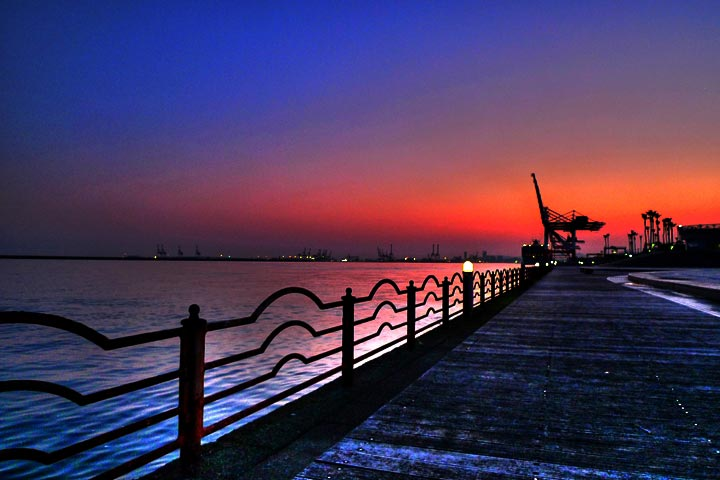
Rokko Island port

Rokkō Island (六甲アイランド, Rokkō Airando) is a man-made island in Higashinada-ku, Kobe, Hyōgo, Japan. Located in the southeast region of the Port of Kobe, the island has a 3.4 km × 2 km (2.1 mi × 1.2 mi) rectangular shape and covers 5.80 km^{2} (2.24 sq mi). The island's central region features a residential area, separated from the industrial and port zones by a green belt. International schools on the island serve students from abroad, alongside certain exclusive foreign condominiums built when Procter & Gamble's Asia headquarters were in the vicinity.

== Creation ==
Kobe is a long and narrow city situated between the coast to the south and the Rokkō Mountains to the north. Due to the city's geographic constraints and growing population, there was limited space for urban expansion. This is a common problem in Japan, as dense forests cover much of the land. As a solution, urban planners in Kobe created the island using rock excavated from nearby mountains.

Workers used the tops from heavily wooded local mountains to the northwest of the city. A ten-mile-long underground conveyor belt was created to move the reclaimed land to the sea. A conveyor carried the rock and earth to barges, which dumped their contents two miles out into the bay. The project took almost twenty years to complete, from 1973 until 1992. The 1,400 acres (570 ha) island is shaped like a rectangle.

Rokkō Island is not the first man-made island in Kobe. Port Island was completed in the same area in 1987, with later additions being built to the original structure in 2009. In 1173, Taira no Kiyomori, a military leader of the late Heian period, also built an island known as Kyogashima.

== Access ==
There are two main forms of public transportation to the island: the Kobe Minato Kanko Bus and the Rokkō Liner. The Rokkō liner is an automated guideway transit system that runs on an elevated viaduct through the central axis of the island and connects to the mainland. The Rokkō Liner stops at three stations on the island: Marine Park, Island Center, and Island Kita-Guchi. It connects Rokkō Island to Minami Uozaki and Uozaki Station on the Hanshin Line, and Sumiyoshi Station on the JR Kobe Line.

The Harbor Highway is a toll road that links Sannomiya and Port Island with Rokko Island. The Hanshin Expressway Route 5 Wangan Route heads to Osaka. Limousine buses departing from the Kobe Bay Sheraton Hotel take passengers to Kansai Airport or Universal Studios Japan. Ferry boats (Hankyu Ferry and Ferry Sunflower) leave the island every day for Kyushu and Shikoku.

== Economy ==
The major business on the island is based around the Kobe-Osaka International Port Corporation which operates port container terminals, port liner berths and port ferry terminals. Several manufacturing companies also operate on the island including the chocolatier, Morozoff Ltd. The Asia One Center used to house the P&G Japan Head Office. Rokkō Island also features businesses catering to residents and tourists including two hotels, shopping, and restaurants.

== Education ==
=== Universities ===
- Kobe International University

=== Public schools ===
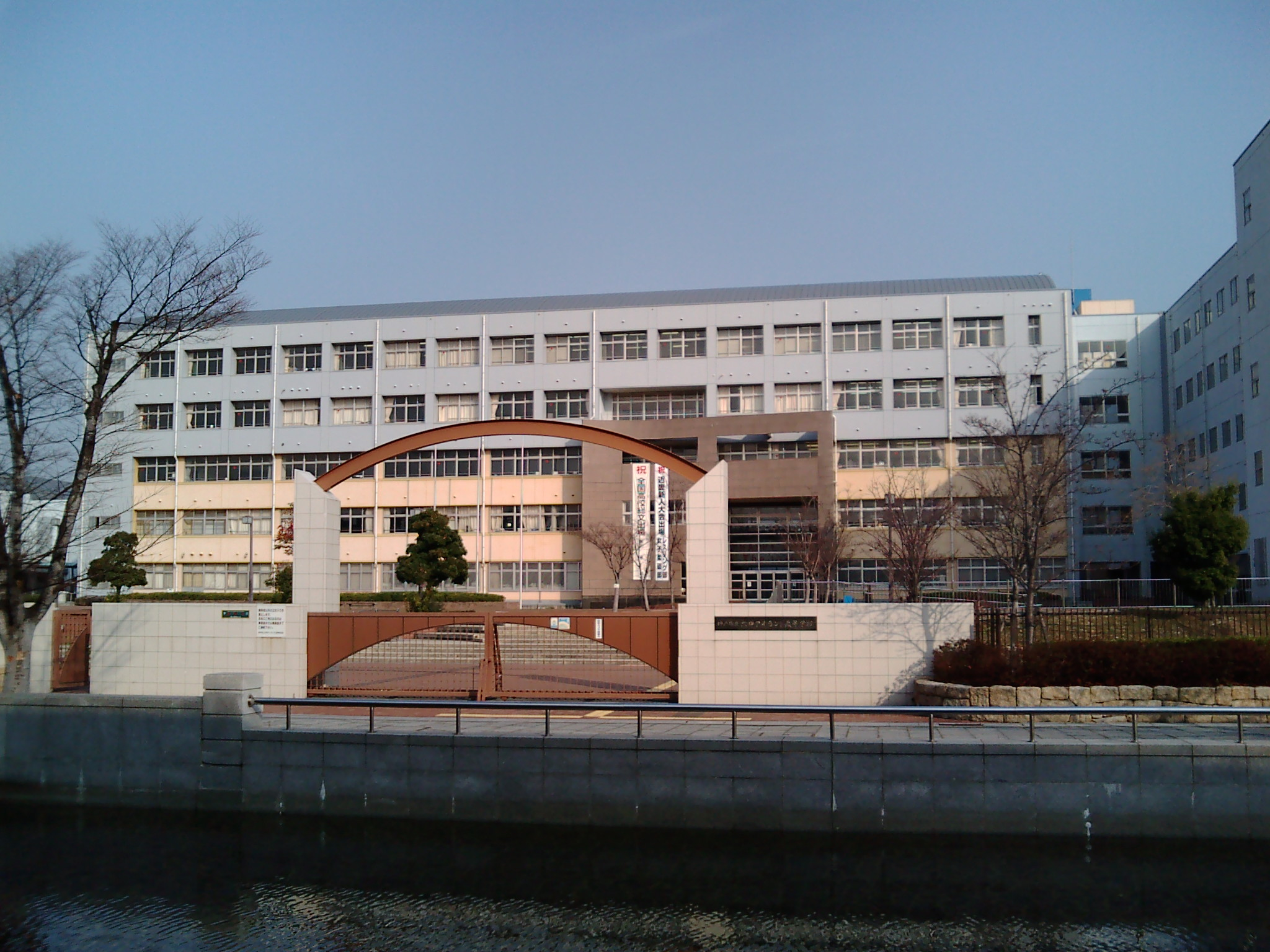
Rokkō Island High School

All are operated by Kobe municipality:

- Rokkō Island High School
- Kōyō Junior High School (神戸市立向洋中学校) - Covers all chome in all three districts in Rokko Island
- Rokkō Island Elementary School (神戸市立六甲アイランド小学校)
  - Koyochohigashi and Koyochonaka 1-4 and 9-chome
- Kōyō Elementary School (神戸市立向洋小学校)
  - Koyochonishi and Koyochonaka 5-8-chome
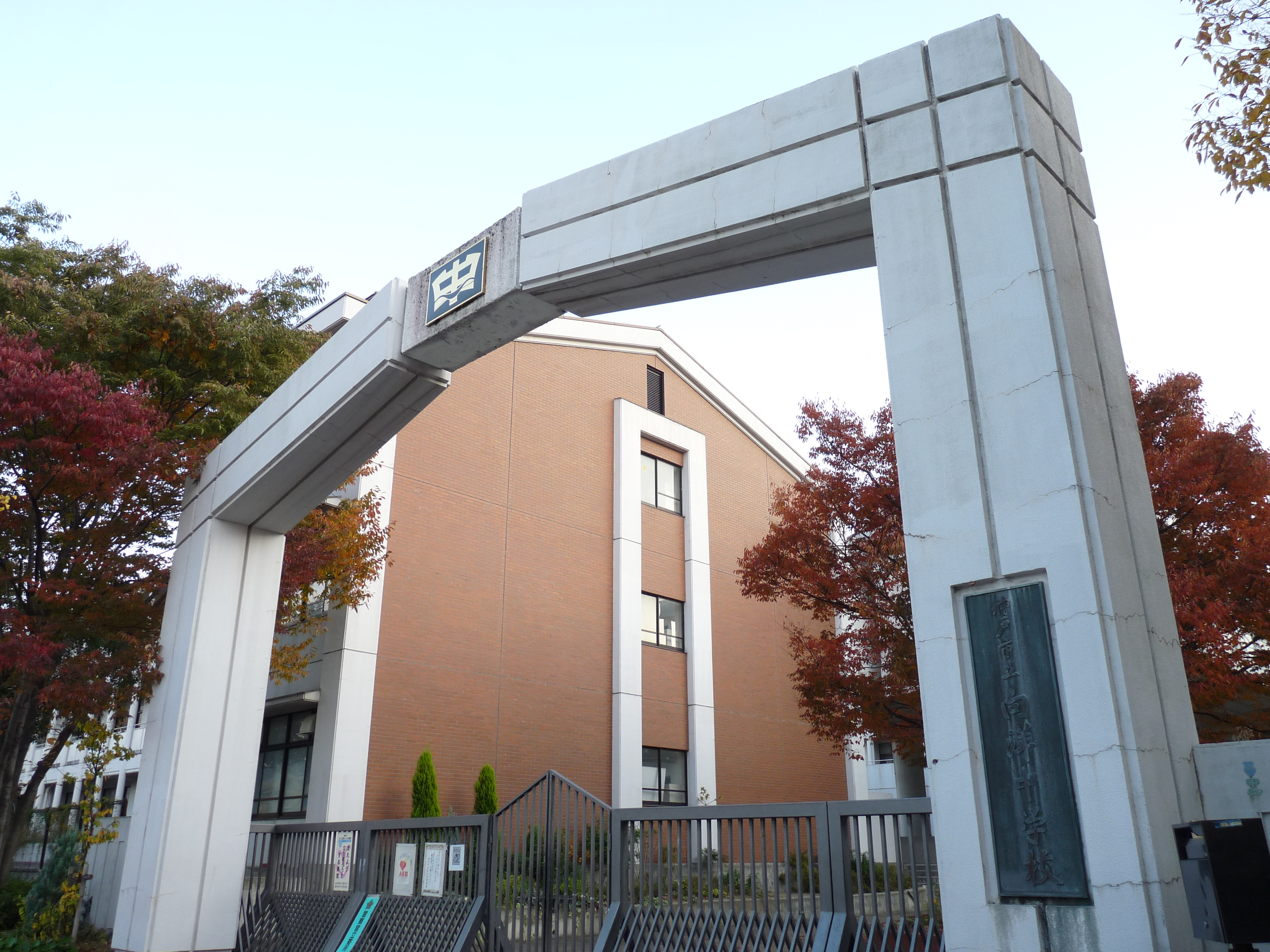
Kōyō Junior High School

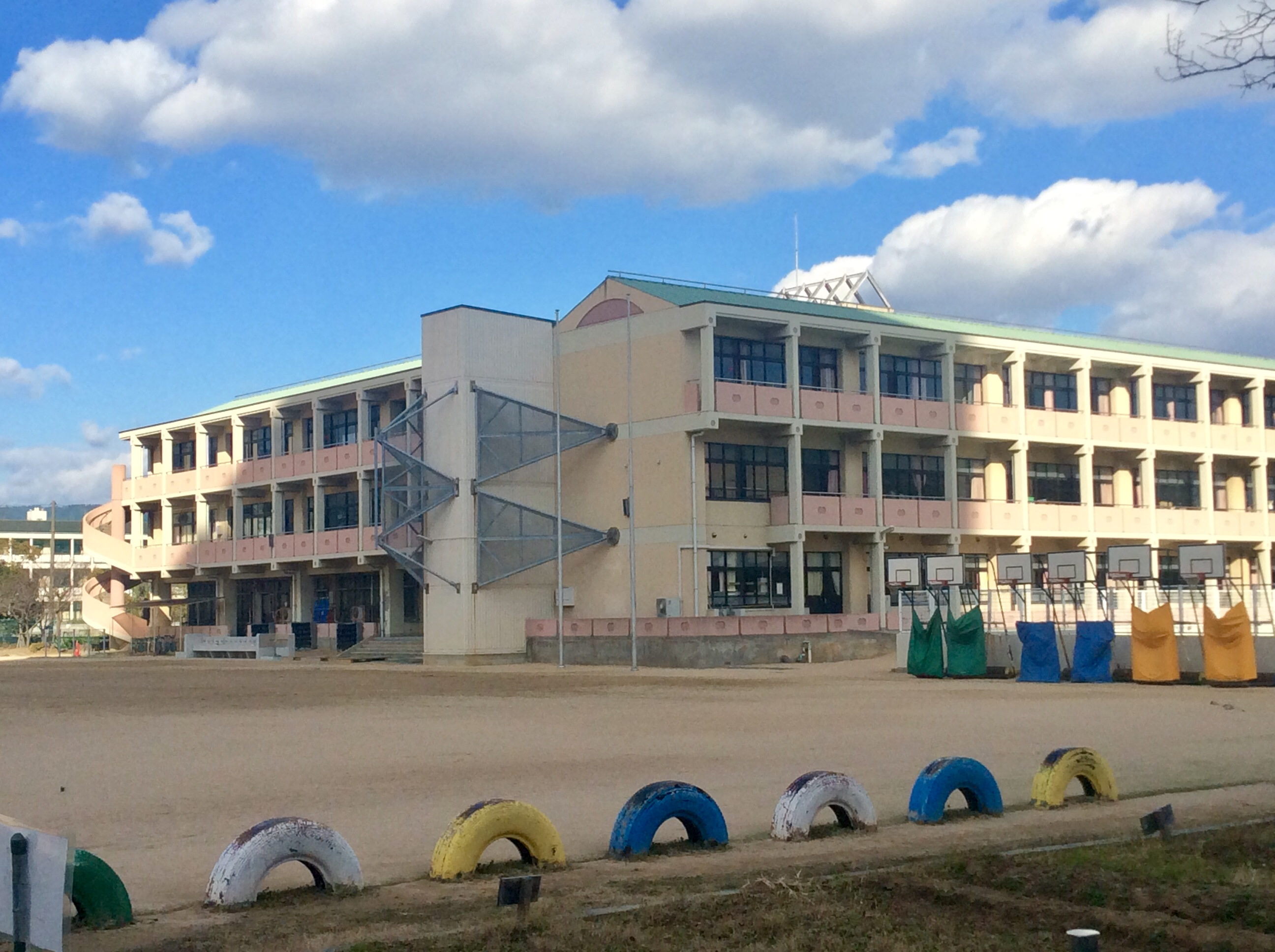
Rokkō Island Elementary School

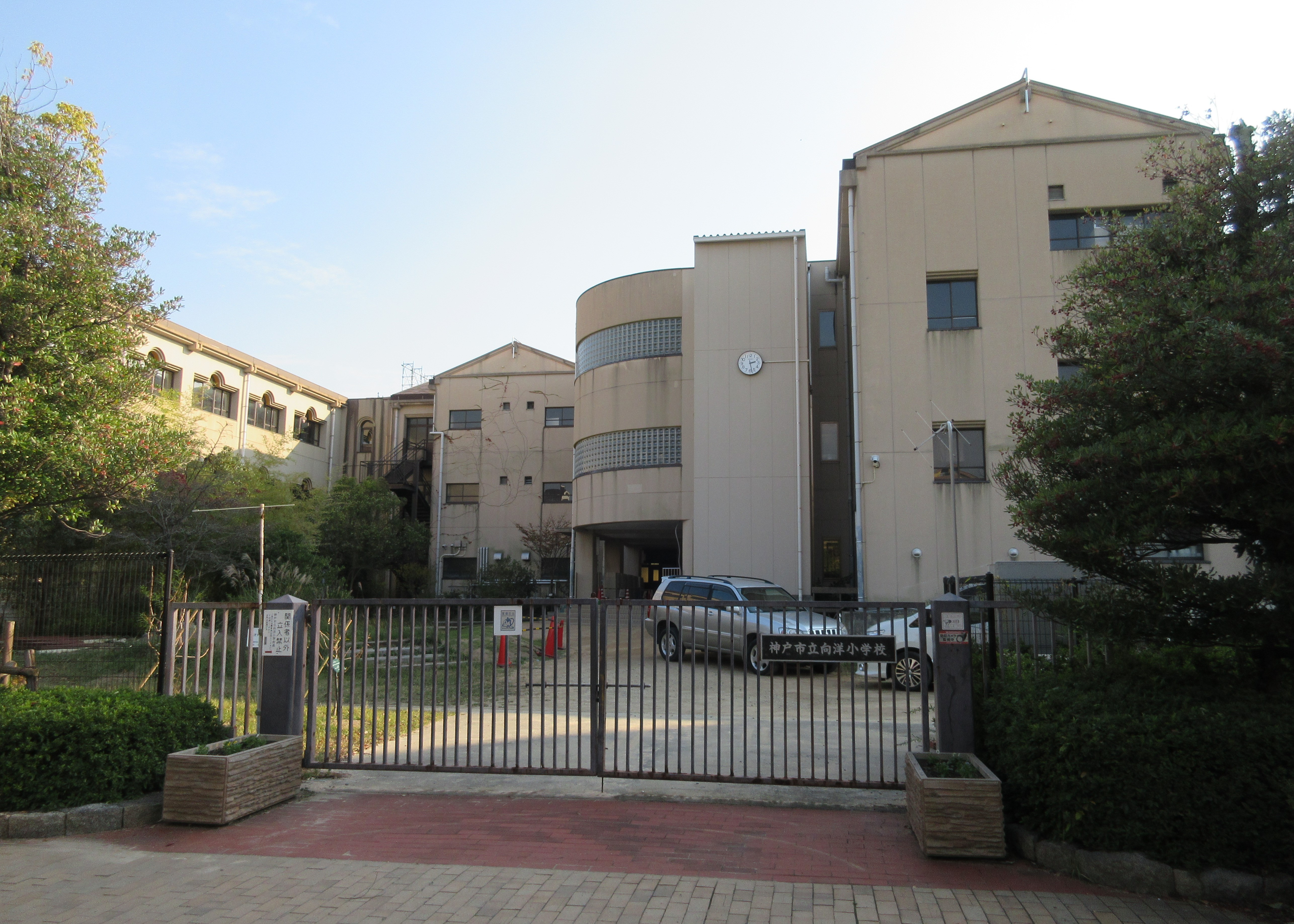
Kōyō Elementary School

=== International schools ===
- Canadian Academy
- Deutsche Schule Kobe/European School

== Culture and recreation ==
=== Sports and leisure ===
There is a 5 km (3.1 mi) long green belt pathway that encircles the island. Marine Park provides views of palm trees and the Pacific Ocean. The River Mall is an artificial river about one kilometer long that flows through the center of the island. In the summer, many children play in the wading pool. There are also several playgrounds on the island.

There is a community fitness center with exercise equipment, classes, and an indoor lap pool. There is an indoor skateboarding park. There are also several places to play futsal. There is also a waterpark which opens during the summer.

=== Museums ===
Two museums are located on Rokkō Island. Kobe City Koiso Memorial Museum of Art is a small museum that commemorates the works of Kobe botanical artist Ryohei Koiso. The museum features a replica of his art studio, an art library, and three exhibition rooms.

The island is also home to the Kobe Fashion Museum, which features exhibits on the history of fashion, seasonal exhibitions, and a library.

=== Events ===
Christmas caroling and a farmer's market are two of the events held throughout the year. The Rokkō Island Halloween and Harvest Festival is an annual event featuring a costume parade, costume contest, pumpkin carving, a haunted house, live shows, and trick-or-treating.
