= Kobe International University =

Private university in Kobe, Hyōgo, Japan

Coordinates: 34°40′50″N 135°16′13″E

Kobe International University (神戸国際大学, Kobe kokusai daigaku) is a private university in Kobe, Hyōgo, Japan. The predecessor of the school was founded in 1963, and it was chartered as a university in 1968. In 1995 the school relocated from its original building in Kobe and moved to a newer building on the man-made island, Rokkō Island.
