= Asia One Center =

Japanese skyscraper

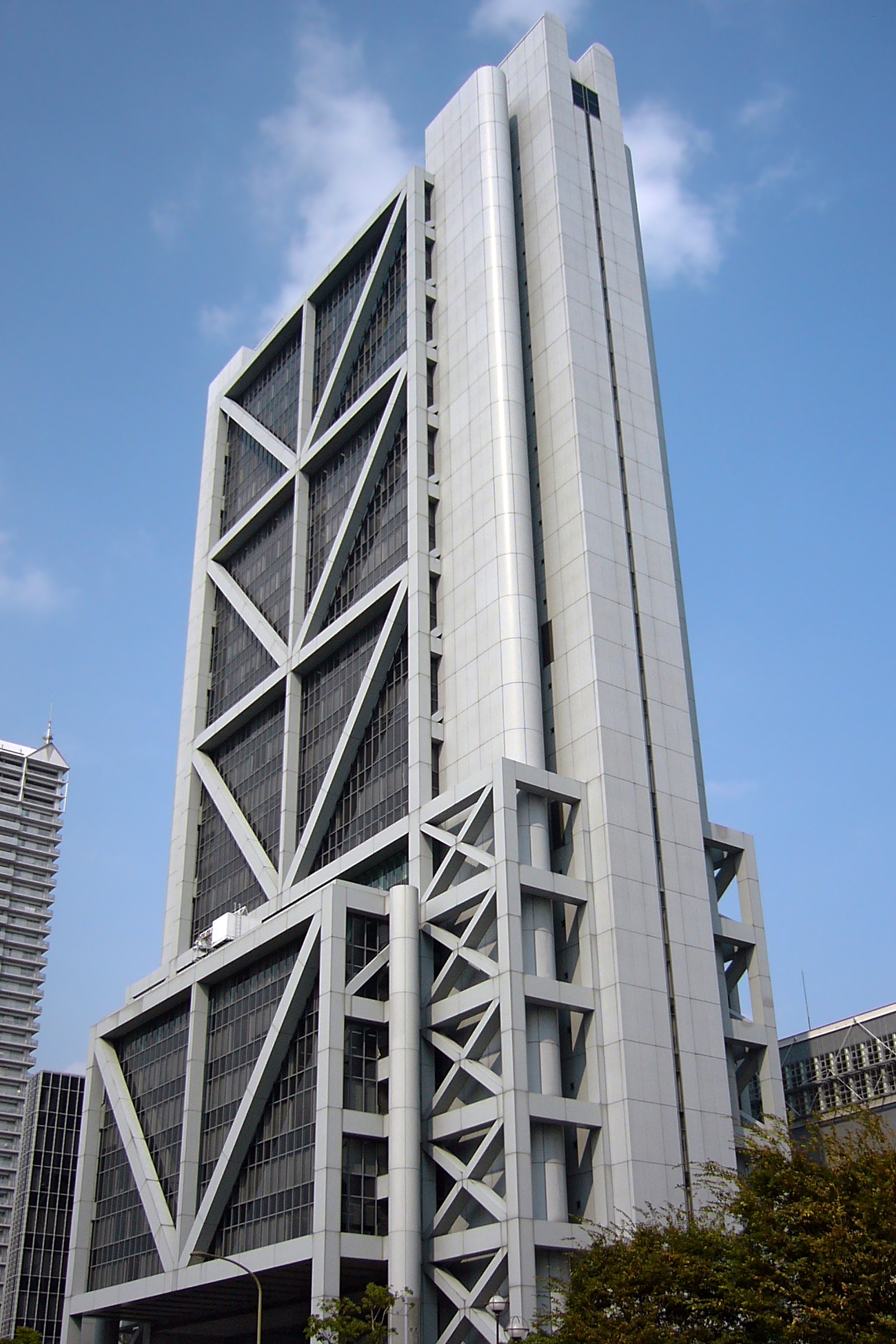
- Asia One Center
- Interactive map of the Asia One Center area
- Former names: P&G Technical Center

General information
- Status: Completed
- Location: Rokko Island, Kobe, Japan
- Coordinates: 34°41′26.2″N 135°16′12.2″E
- Opening: 1993
- Cost: JPY 25 billion
- Owner: KOBE ONE 合同会社

Height
- Top floor: 43,000 m^{2} (460,000 sq ft)

Technical details
- Floor count: 31
- Floor area: 43,000 m^{2} (460,000 sq ft)
- Lifts/elevators: 10

Website
- www.asiaonejp.com

The Asia One Center (アジアワンセンター) is a 131 meter tall skyscraper located at Center of Rokkō Island, Kobe City, Japan. The 31-story building was previously named Procter & Gamble Technical Center and was the Asia headquarters of Procter and Gamble Group. Asia One Center was designed by the Takenaka Corporation.

The Asia One Center is located at the heart of Rokkō Island with total floor area of 43,000 m^{2} (460,000 sq ft). The building is split into several sections: At lobby level, it has a seminar room, the fourth to eleventh floors are a research and development center, and the top section are business offices.
