= Rokkō Island Line =

Transit system in Kobe, Japan

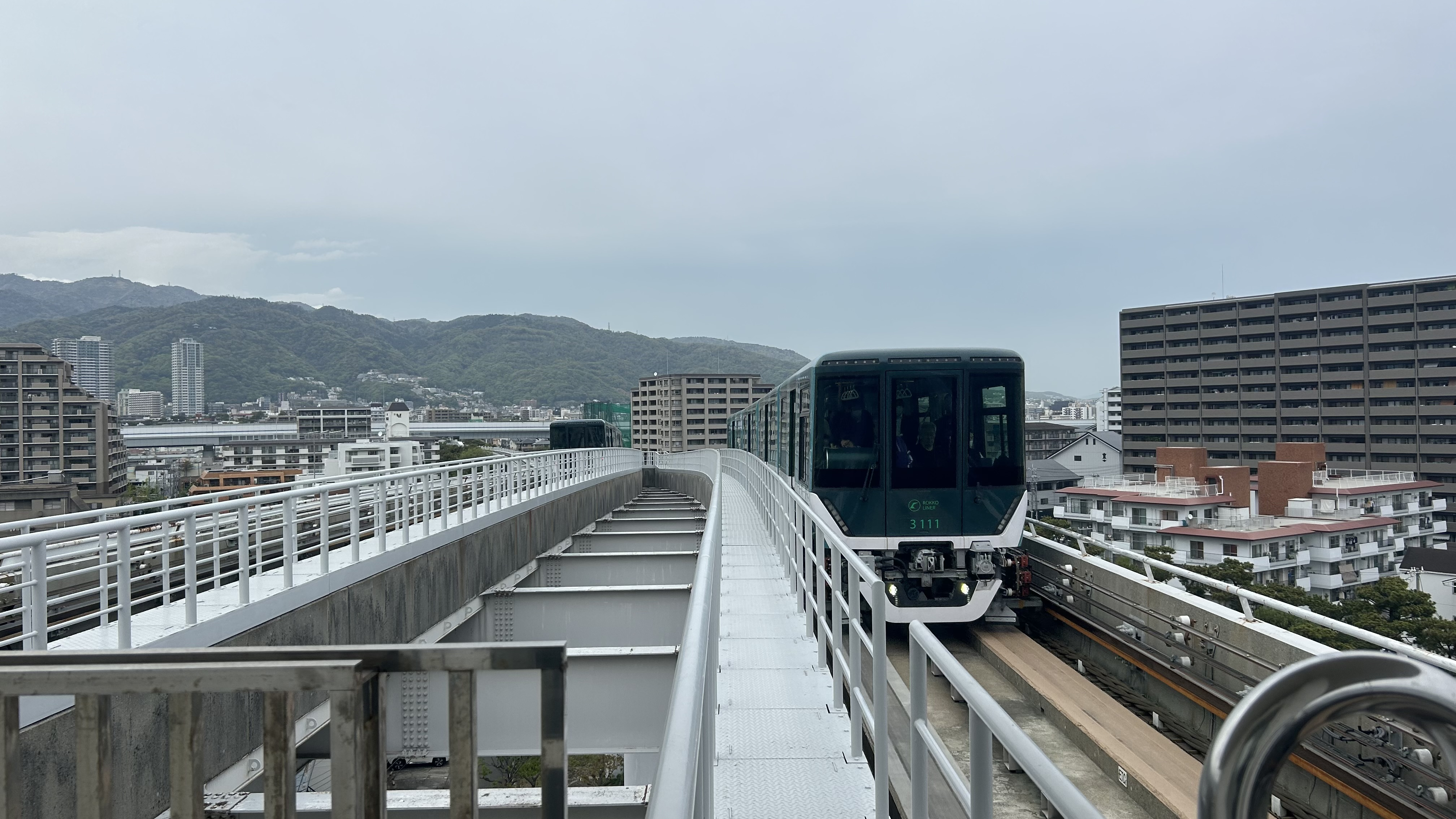
- 3000 series train

Overview
- Locale: Rokkō Island, Kobe, Hyogo Prefecture, Japan
- Termini: Sumiyoshi; Marine Park
- Stations: 6

Service
- System: Automated guideway transit

History
- Opened: 21 February 1990

Technical
- Line length: 4.5 km (2.8 mi)
- Operating speed: 65 km/h (40 mph)

The Kobe New Transit Rokkō Island Line (神戸新交通六甲アイランド線, Kōbe Shin-Kōtsū Rokkō Airando Sen), commonly known as Rokkō Liner (六甲ライナー, Rokkō Rainā) is an automated guideway transit system in Kobe, Japan. Upon its opening on 21 February 1990, it became the second AGT line operated by Kobe New Transit. The line connects the man-made Rokkō Island to Sumiyoshi Station on the JR Kobe Line.

== Stations ==
No.	Station Name	Japanese	Distance (km)		Transfers	Location	
No.	Station Name	Japanese	Between Stations	Total Distance	Transfers	Location	
R01	Sumiyoshi	住吉	-	0.0	JR West JR Kobe Line (Tokaido Line) (JR-A57)	Higashinada-ku; Kobe	Hyōgo; Prefecture
R02	Uozaki	魚崎	1.2	1.2	Hanshin Main Line (HS23)	Higashinada-ku; Kobe	Hyōgo; Prefecture
R03	Minami-Uozaki	南魚崎	0.8	2.0		Higashinada-ku; Kobe	Hyōgo; Prefecture
R04	Island Kitaguchi	アイランド北口	1.5	3.5		Higashinada-ku; Kobe	Hyōgo; Prefecture
R05	Island Center	アイランドセンター	0.4	3.9		Higashinada-ku; Kobe	Hyōgo; Prefecture
R06	Marine Park	マリンパーク	0.6	4.5		Higashinada-ku; Kobe	Hyōgo; Prefecture

== Rolling stock ==
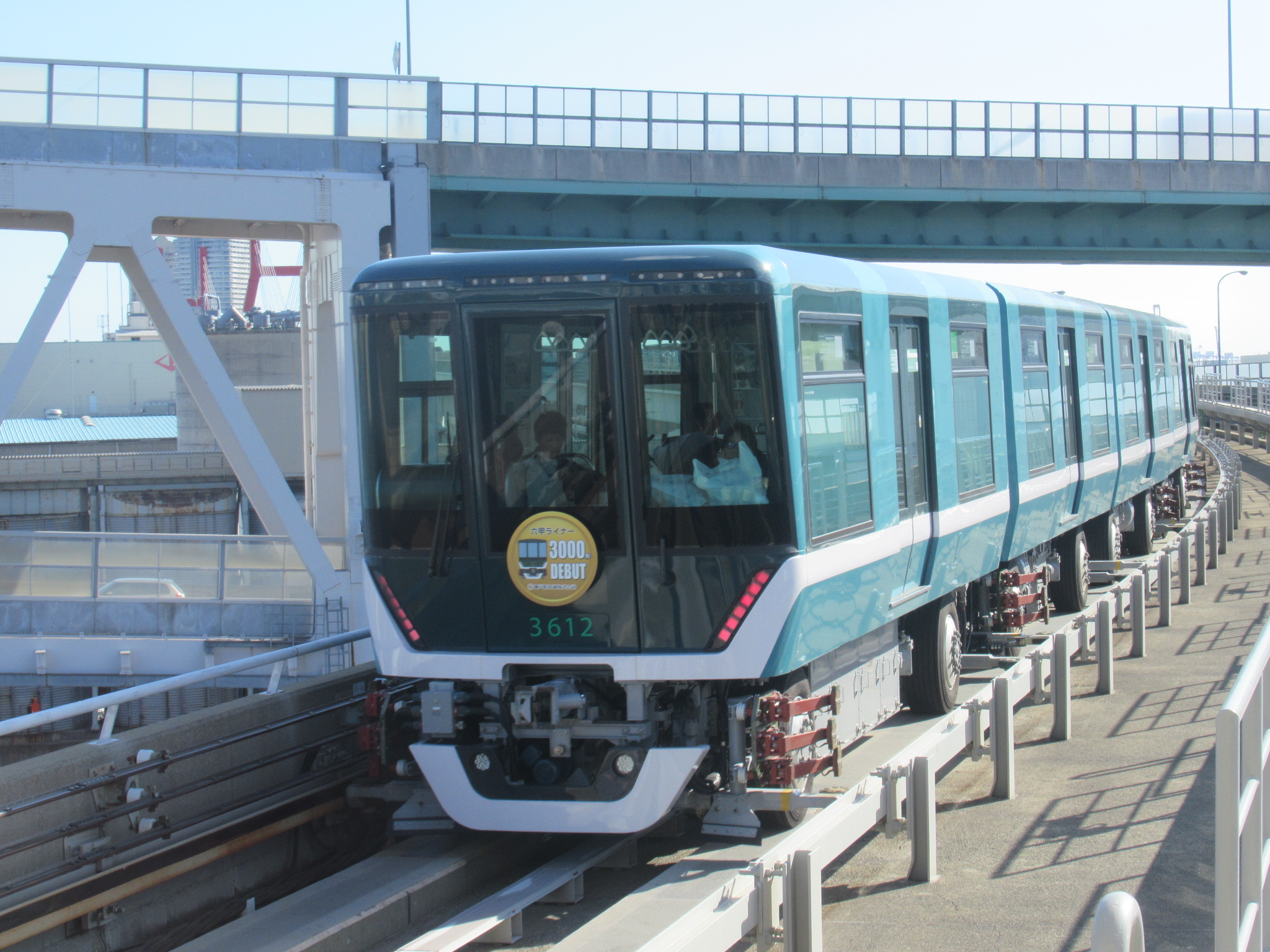
3000 series

- Kobe New Transit 3000 series (since 2018)
- Kobe New Transit 1000 series (from 1990 until 2023)

== Extension plan ==
There is a plan to extend the line from the Marine Park to the south of Rokko Island, which is currently under construction.

== See also ==
- Port Island Line
