= DSK International =

- 神戸ドイツ学院

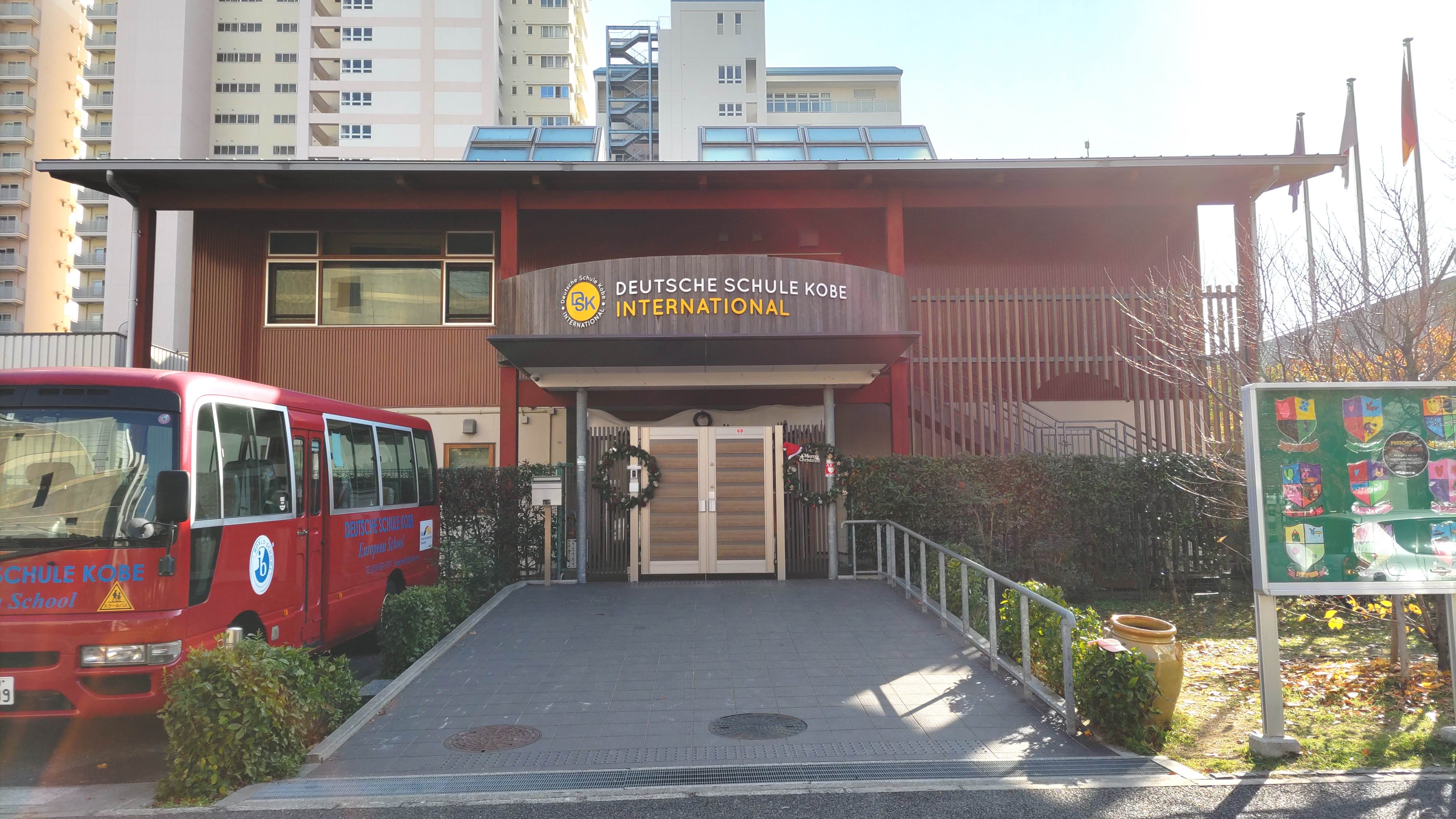
- Deutsche Schule Kobe International

Location
- 3-2-8 Koyochonaka Higashinada-ku Kobe city 日本兵庫県神戸市東灘区向洋町中３丁目２−８; Rokkō Island, Higashinada-ku, Kobe; Japan; 34.6870603°N 135.27002719999996°E

Information
- Type: International School
- Established: 1909
- Website: dskobe.org

DSK International (DSKI; 神戸ドイツ学院 Kobe Doitsu Gakuin) is an international school on Rokkō Island, in Higashinada-ku, Kobe, Japan. DSK International is an International IB school in Kobe for ages 2 to 12. The school provides curriculum in three languages: German, English and Japanese in two branches (German and International). DSK International offers three programmes for learners ages 2–12: Playgroup, Early Years and Primary Years Programme (PYP).

== History ==
DSKI, the second oldest German international school in the Far East region, and one of the oldest schools for foreign students in Japan, was founded in 1909. It was intended to serve expatriate and missionary families from Germany, Austria, and Switzerland. The school was established as relations between Germany and Japan strengthened.

In 2002 the School Board decided to add an international section: the European School was to serve the English speaking community and teach an international curriculum. Since then, the school has provided learners with curricula in German and English.

In 2009 the school moved into its fifth school house on Rokkō Island.

In 2017 came another big change for the school with the name change to DSK International or DSKI for short.

== Programmes ==
DSKI offers three programmes of instruction based on age: Playgroup (1 to 3 years), Early Years Programme (3 to 5 years) and Primary Years Programme (5 to 12 years).

=== Playgroup ===
Playgroup is a parent-child programme that meets once a week, Thursday mornings as of 2016, in two groups. The activities focus on introducing children ages 1 to 3 to the school and different cultures, promoting pre-literacy skills, like listening and speaking, and improving social skills.

=== Early Years Programme ===
The Early Years Programme consists of a Pre-Kindergarten class (2 years old) and the Early Years/Kindergarten (3 to 5 years old). The Early Years Programme is IB-accredited and prepares learners for entrance into the IB Primary Years Programme.

Learning in the Early Years Programme is centered around supported play in a safe, secure environment. Teachers facilitate play activities that focus on language and reasoning skills, autonomous thinking and problem solving, manipulative skills and creativity, emotional growth and cognitive development.

=== Primary Years Programme ===
DSKI uses two educational plans to create a comprehensive, inquiry-based programme: the Primary Years Programme authorized by the International Baccalaureate and the Thüringer Curriculum.

Classrooms teachers integrate language, mathematics, science, art, personal and social education, drama and ICT (technology) into units that focus on discovering more about who we are and the larger world. Specialist teachers provide music, physical education and language learning (German, English and/or Japanese).

== See also ==
- Education in Kobe
