= Kobe Korean Senior High School =

North Korea-affiliated school in Japan

Coordinates: 34.6423°N 135.0529°E

Kobe Korean Senior High School (神戸朝鮮高級学校 Kōbe Chōsen Kōkyūgakkō; 고베조선고급학교) is a Korean heritage high school in Tarumi-ku, Kobe, Japan.

== See also ==
- Education in Kobe
