= Tarumi, Hyōgo =

Dissolved municipality in Hyōgo prefecture, Japan

Tarumi (垂水町, Tarumi-cho) was a town formed in 1889 in Akashi District, Hyōgo Prefecture, Japan. In July 1941 it merged into the Suma ward of Kobe. The town's boundaries at the time of the merger generally coincide with the current Tarumi ward of Kobe.

== History ==
The name Tarumi literally means "sagging water", i.e. a waterfall, and refers to the waterfalls that were along the northern side of the road that stretched from eastern Tarumi beyond Shioya. The name is attested to in the Engishiki published in the tenth century.

On 1 April 1899 a new municipal system came into force and Tarumi village (垂水村) was formed from seven villages (Higashi-Tarumi, Yamada, Nishi-Tarumi, Tamon, Shioya, Shimohata and Myodani). In October 1928 the village became a town. In July 1941 the town merged into neighbouring Kobe city, becoming part of the Suma ward.
