= Island Center Station =

Railway station in Kobe, Hyogo prefecture, Japan

Coordinates: 34.6892°N 135.2693°E

Island Center Station アイランドセンター駅
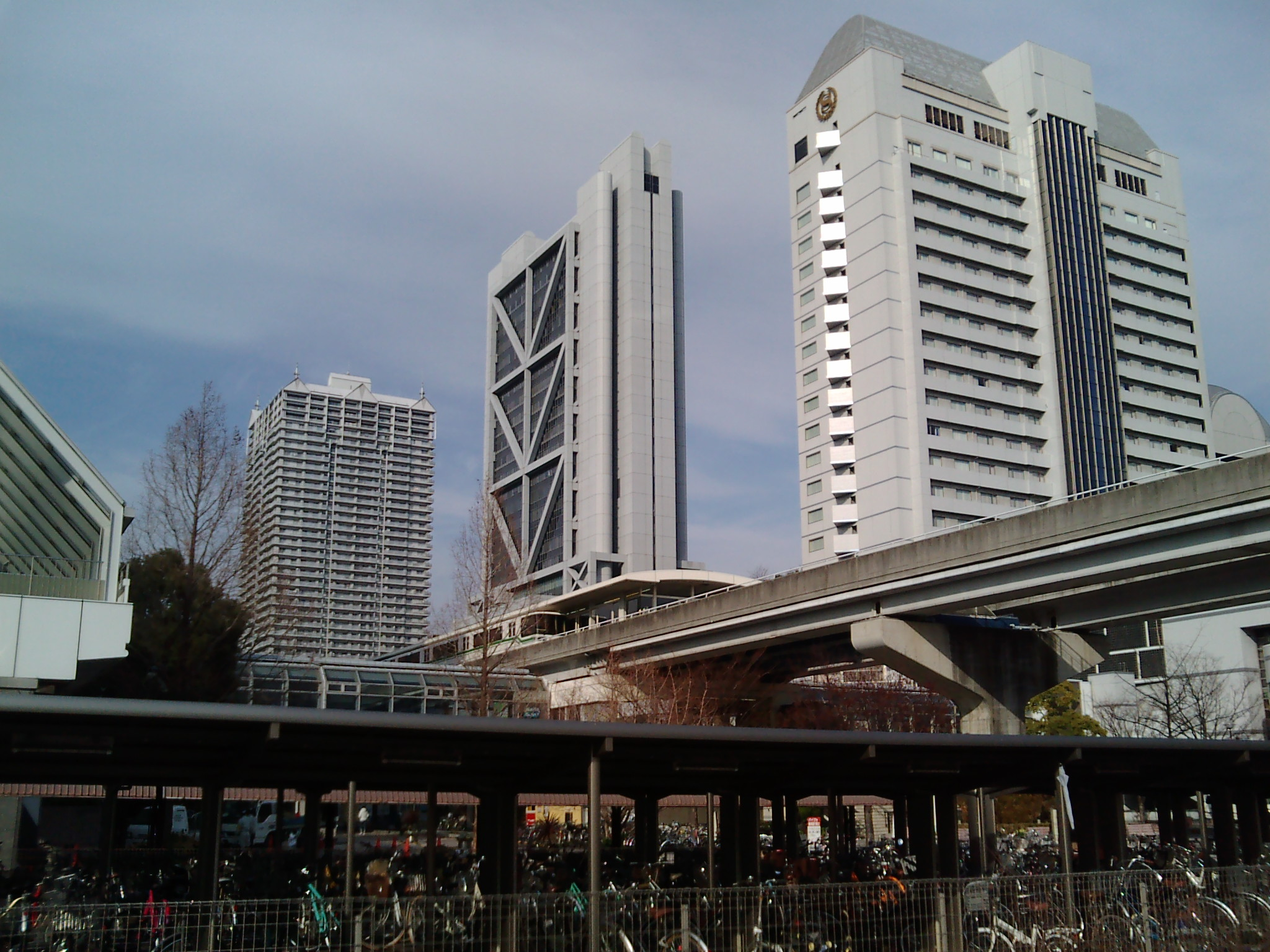

General information
- Location: 2 Kōyōchō Naka, Higashinada, Kobe, Hyōgo （兵庫県神戸市東灘区向洋町中二丁目） Japan
- Operator: Kobe New Transit
- Line: Rokko Island Line

Other information
- Station code: R05

History
- Opened: February 21, 1990
Location

Island Center Station (アイランドセンター駅, Airando-Sentā-eki) is a railway station operated by Kobe New Transit on the Rokko Island Line in Kobe, Hyōgo Prefecture, Japan.

== Lines ==
Island Center Station is served by the Rokko Island Line's automated guideway transit, and is located 3.9 kilometers from the terminus of the line at Sumiyoshi Station.

== Station layout ==
Island Center Station has a single island platform.

=== Platforms ===
1	■ Rokko Island Line	for Marine Park
2	■ Rokko Island Line	for Sumiyoshi

== Adjacent stations ==
«	Service	»
Rokko Island Line (R05)
Island Kitaguchi (R04)	-	Marine Park (R06)

== History ==
Island Center Station opened on February 21, 1990.
