= Kobe University of Fashion and Design =

Coordinates: 34°40′28″N 134°58′10″E

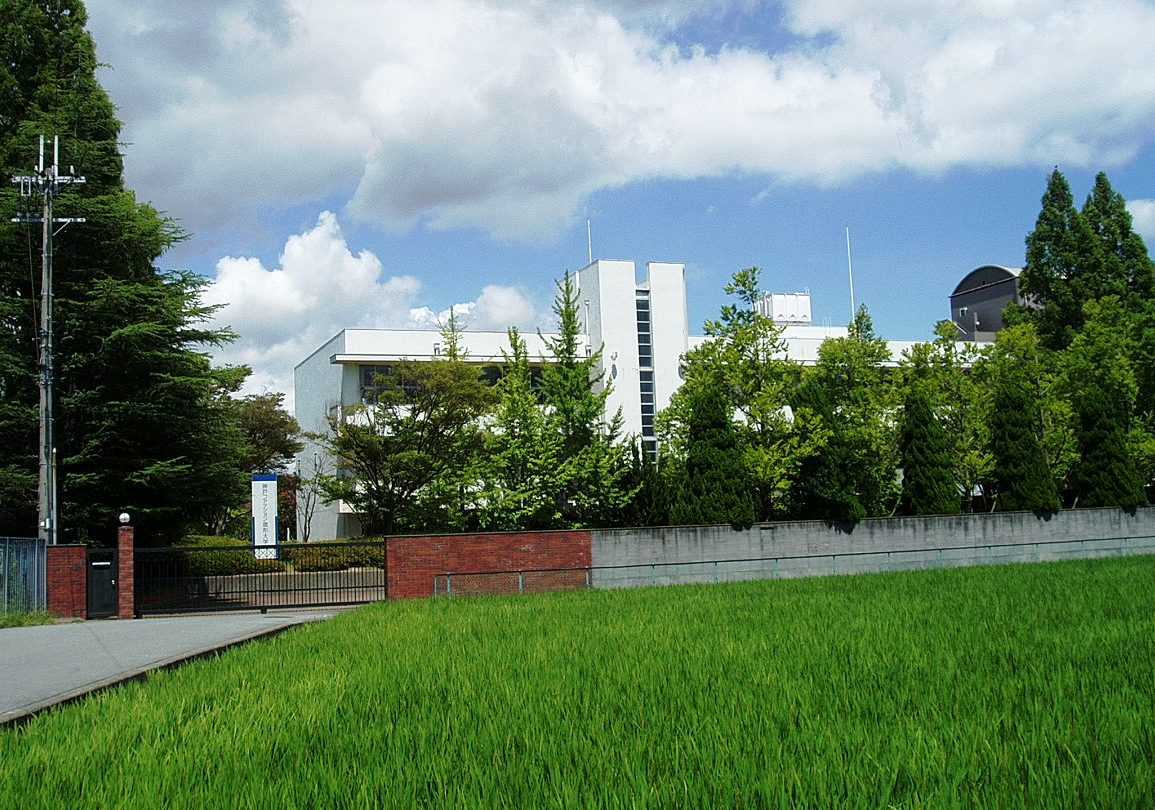
Main gate

Kobe University of Fashion and Design (神戸ファッション造形大学, Kōbe fasshon zōkei daigaku) was a private university in Akashi, Hyōgo, Japan.

== History ==
The school was founded in 1937 as Kobe Dressmaker Jogakuin (神戸ドレスメーカー女学院; jogakuin means "women's academy"). In 1967 the school foundation established Akashi Women's Junior College, which became coeducational in 1969 and was renamed Akashi Junior College (After the Michiyo Okabe nude murder case, it was renamed Kobe College of Liberal Arts in 1990). In 2005 a part of the junior college was reorganized into Kobe University of Fashion and Design. In 2010 the university announced that it stopped admitting students and that it would be closed in March 2013.

== Organization ==
=== Undergraduate schools ===
- Faculty of Fashion and Design

=== Affiliated schools ===
- Kobe College of Fashion and Design (a junior college, formerly Kobe College of Liberal Arts)
- Kobe Fashion Institute (a technical college in Chūō-ku, Kobe)
