= Canadian Academy =

- 学校法人カネディアン・アカデミイ

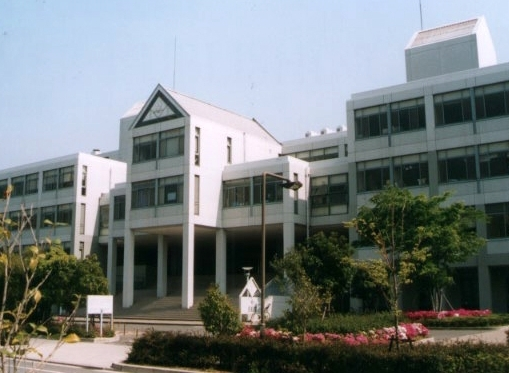

Location
- 4-1 Koyo-cho Naka Higashinada-ku, Kobe, Hyogo 658-0032; Japan; 34.68486°N 135.27392°E

Information
- Type: Private/co-educational
- Motto: Scientia Clavis Successus (Knowledge is the key to success)
- Founded: 1913; 113 years ago
- Head of school: Lindsey Berns
- Enrollment: 640
- Colors: Red and Grey
- Mascot: Falcons
- Website: www.canacad.ac.jp

Canadian Academy (Japanese: カネディアン・アカデミイ, Hepburn: Kanedian Akademii), also known as CA, is an independent pre-K–12 international school in Kobe, Japan which was founded in 1913. The not-for-profit day and boarding school consists of an elementary school, middle school, and high school all located on the campus on Rokkō Island, a man-made island. The school is approved by the Japanese Ministry of Education and accredited by the U.S. based Western Association of Schools and Colleges (WASC) and the Council of International Schools (CIS). The school is certified to award both the International Baccalaureate (IB) and U.S. high school diplomas.

== History ==
On September 13, 1913, Canadian Methodist Academy opened with sixteen students at Aotani-cho. Under the leadership of Principal Mrs. Ethel Gould Misener, the school served children of missionary parents from grade one through high school and offered boarding facilities for students. The school changed its name to Canadian Academy in 1917. In 1920, CA held its first graduation ceremony and PTA Bazaar, predecessor of the annual Food Fair.

The campus expanded in the 1920s adding a girls' dormitory and Memorial Hall. On newly purchased land on Nagamine Heights, the Duke of Gloucester dedicated a boy's dormitory, Gloucester House, named in his honor in May 1929. The Latin Motto of Scientia Clavis Successus, knowledge is the key to success, was chosen in 1921 as was the school song. The school housed refugees from the Great Kanto Earthquake of 1923.

CA remained at the Aotani-cho campus until it closed due to World War II. The last formal graduation ceremony took place in 1942. The Japanese government seized the school to serve as internment camps for enemy aliens. Only Gloucester House and the principal's house survived the extensive bombings of Kobe in 1945. After the war, Occupation Forces used Gloucester House as a hostel.

On September 17, 1952, CA reopened its doors at Gloucester House with six teachers and 110 students. The school began to rebuild and grow for the next few decades at Nagamine Heights. In the 1970s, the Western Association of Schools and Colleges first accredited the school. Also, under the guidance of Mitsuko Unno, members of the Japanese culture club presented their first kabuki performance. By the 1980s, it became clear that more space and newer facilities were needed.

In September 1990, the school relocated to expanded facilities on Rokko Island. On Transition Day, students and teachers walked from the Nagamine Heights campus to the new one on Rokko Island. In January 1995, the Great Hanshin earthquake devastated Kobe. Nearly 3,500 people sought shelter in school facilities.

The Early Learning and Activities Center (ELAC) opened in January 2008 on what was once the location of the Norwegian School. Over 200 alumni returned to their alma mater for the centennial anniversary celebrations in 2013.

== Curriculum ==
Canadian Academy's more than 85 faculty members from around the world teach a college preparatory program in English.

The school began by incorporating the IB Diploma Programme. Later, the school implemented the International Baccalaureate Organization's Primary Years Program (PYP), and Middle Years Program (MYP). The school became an IB World School in 2011.

In addition to academics, the school offers extra-curricular activities for all ages. The school is a founding member of the Asia Pacific Activities Conference (APAC) for annual athletic tournaments and performing arts festivals among twelve international schools in the Asia-Pacific region.

== Facilities ==
The modern 9-acre campus, which opened in 1990, includes the main building, Gloucester House dormitory, and Early Learning and Activities Center (ELAC), opened in January 2008. Fully equipped classrooms are all networked to the internet and have computers. The Herbert Norman Library and Media Center houses more than 42,000 volumes and is supplemented by a library in ELAC. Other facilities include a cafeteria with seating for 300 students, the main building Theater with seating for almost 400 people, and the P&G Black Box theater. Athletic facilities include two gymnasiums, a fitness center, two tennis courts, artificially turfed playing fields including a full-size soccer pitch, and two elementary school playgrounds.

Prior to its move to Rokko Island in 1990, the school overlooked Kobe for many decades in Nagamine Heights, a residential area located below Mt. Maya and Mt. Rokko.

== Student body ==
At the beginning of the 2017–2018 school year, there were 641 students (Pre-K- 5: 280; Middle School: 141; and High School: 220 (includes approximately 15 boarding students). The student body is made up of as many as 40 different nationalities with about 18% North American, 8% European, 56% Asian (including 25% Japanese) and 18% representing the rest of the world.

Canadian Academy is the third-largest expatriate international school in Japan and the largest in the Kobe/Osaka/Kyoto area. The school enrolls many students from the Rokko Island area as well as surrounding communities.

== Alumni ==
Close to 3,000 students have graduated from Canadian Academy since its founding in 1913. CA is the alma mater of Olympic athletes, artists, diplomats, musicians, filmmakers, writers, businesspeople, MDs, and other professionals including in alphabetical order:

- Joji, Japanese-Australian singer-songwriter, record producer and former YouTube personality
- Desmond Morton, Canadian historian
- Yuriko Backes, diplomat and politician
- Mary Brown, educator
- Luke Gillespie, American jazz and classical pianist
- David Hayter, screen and voice actor and screenwriter
- Ellen McIlwaine, guitarist
- Kana Muramoto, Japanese Olympic ice dancer and three-time Japanese national champion
- Donald Shively, Japanologist
- Taizo Sugitani, member of the Japanese Olympic Equestrian team
- Kikuë Tachibana, scientist
- Mackenzie Clugston, former Canadian ambassador to Japan
- Ayaka Kimura, Japanese actress and singer; former member of J-pop idol group, Coconuts Musume
- Ema Ryan Yamazaki, documentary filmmaker

== See also ==
- Education in Kobe
- List of international schools in Japan
- Japan Council of International Schools
- Kansai region
