= Yasuhiro Yamashita (architect) =

- Born: 1960; Amami, Kagoshima, Japan
- Education: Shibaura Institute of Technology
- Occupation: Architect
- Awards: AR Emerging Architecture Awards 2004; LEAF Award 2013; International Architecture Awards 2014; Japan Institute of Architects Awards 2013; ARCASIA Awards for Architecture 2015; Japan Concrete Institute Awards 2016; The ACI Excellence in Concrete Construction Awards 2017 fib Awards for Outstanding Concrete Structures 2018; Asia Pacific Property Awards 2019
- Practice: Atelier TEKUTO
- Buildings: Cell Bricks; Crystal Bricks; Lucky Drops; Magritte's; Reflection of Mineral; Earth Bricks; Boundary House; Monoclinic; R-torso-C; Nest at Amami Beach Villas
- Website: www.tekuto.com/en/

Yasuhiro Yamashita (山下 保博, Yasuhiro Yamashita; born 1960) is a Japanese architect and founder of the architecture firm Atelier TEKUTO. He has received various architectural awards for his urban micro-house designs, disaster relief projects and creative use of materials and construction methods.

== Early life and education ==
Yamashita was born on 26 April 1960 in Amami Oshima, a subtropical island in the southern part of Japan. After obtaining a master's degree in architecture from Shibaura Institute of Technology, he worked at several architectural practices before founding his own firm Atelier TEKUTO in 1991.

== Career ==
In 2004, Yamashita received the AR Emerging Architecture Award for Cell Bricks, an urban micro-house in Tokyo. The same year, he won an international competition to design Busan Eco-Center (Nakdong Estuary Eco-Center), a museum dedicated to the conservation of the local waterbirds and environment, in Busan, Korea.

Ever since the Great Hanshin earthquake in 1995, Yamashita has been actively engaged in disaster relief activities. In the wake of the Tohoku Earthquake in 2011, he designed a community home named "Home-for-All for Fishermen in Kamaishi" together with Toyo Ito & Associates.

In 2013, he won the design competition for a post-disaster public housing in Kamaishi, Iwate, under the name of TeMaLi Architects. The housing project was awarded the LEAF Awards 2013, along with two other projects of Yamashita (Boundary House and Emergency Supply Warehouse).

He founded Regional Material Utilization Network in 2013, an institute that serves as a platform to utilize materials and construction methods of various regions in order to help boost the local economy and vitalize the community. SHIRASU concrete, a concrete that contains the deposit of pyroclastic flow of volcanic ash SHIRASU, amassed in Kagoshima Japan, as fine aggregate is one such material. R-torso-C, a private residence built with SHIRASU concrete gained both domestic and international acclaim, winning Japan Concrete Institute Awards, The ACI Excellence in Concrete Construction Awards, fib Awards for Outstanding Concrete Structure Awards.

Since 2014, Yamashita has been conducting a research on elderly facilities as a visiting professor at Kyushu University.

In 2016, he started to renovate vacant houses in Amami in order to converted them into lodging facilities called Denpaku, which aims to pass on "traditional and legendary architecture, community and culture" to the future generation.

In July 2018, Yamashita renovated a former supermarket and opened a community center "Denpaku + Magun" which consists of tourist accommodations, elderly facility, eatery and food mart in Amami. In this project, he is not only the architect but also the owner and head of the management of the facility.

== Awards ==
- 2004: AR Emerging Architecture Awards (Award, Cell Brick), 11th Space Design Competition (Gold Prize, Crystal Bricks)
- 2005: Good Design Award, Lucky Drops
- 2007: Japan Society For Finishing Technology in Japan Residential Award (Residential Award, aLuminum house), Wallpaper Award (the Best Bolthole, Reflection of Mineral)
- 2008: Archip Architecture Award, Private Residence Innovation (Grand Prix, Reflection of Mineral), 15th Space Design Competition (Gold Prize, Twin Bricks; Honorable Prize, White Ladybird), International Architecture Awards (Award, Reflection of Mineral)
- 2009: Japan Association of Architectural Firms award (Award of Excellence, Reflection of Mineral), 16th Space Design Competition (Gold Prize, Ethiopia Millenium Pavilion)
- 2010: Japan Aluminum Association Award (New Development Prize, A-ring), Kanazawa Beauty Cultural Landscape Award (Award of Excellence, A-ring), Lighting Promotion Award (Award of Excellence, A-ring & Aluminum House Project)
- 2011: 18th Space Design Competition (Grand Prize, Earth Bricks), Green Good Design,(Award of Excellence, A-ring Super Long Lasting Prefabricated Houses), IBEC Sustainable Residential Award (Grand Award, A-ring), Residential Architect Design Awards, Restoration/Preservation (Grand Prize, Yachiyo)
- 2012: Good Design Award, Earth Bricks
- 2013: LEAF Awards 2013 [Awarded for 3 categories] (Residential Building of the Year, Boundary House; Best Sustainable Development of the Year, Emergency Supply Warehouse; Best Future Building, Disaster Relief Public Housing in Kamaishi), Wood Design Award (Breakthrough Award, Boundary House), IBEC Sustainable Residential Award (Better Living Administrative Director's Award, Earth Bricks)
- 2014: International Architecture Awards (Disaster Relief Public Housing in Kamaishi), The Japan Institute of Architects Award (Boundary House), Japan Association of Architectural Firms (Outstanding performance award, Boundary House)
- 2015: ARCASIA Awards for Architecture (Gold medal, Boundary House)
- 2016: WAN Concrete Award (Shortlisted, R torso C), Japan Concrete Institute Award (Best Work Award, R torso C)
- 2017: American Concrete Institute Excellence in Concrete Construction Award (Overall Excellence Award & 1st place in the Low Rise Category, R torso C)
- 2018: fib (Fédération internationale du béton) Awards for Outstanding Concrete Structures (Winner – Buildings Category, R torso C)
- 2019: Asia Pacific Property Awards, Hotel Architecture Category & New Hotel Development and Design (Award Winner, Nest at Amami Beach Villas)
