= Hyogo University of Health Sciences =

Private university in Kobe, Hyōgo, Japan

Coordinates: 34°40′01″N 135°12′16″E

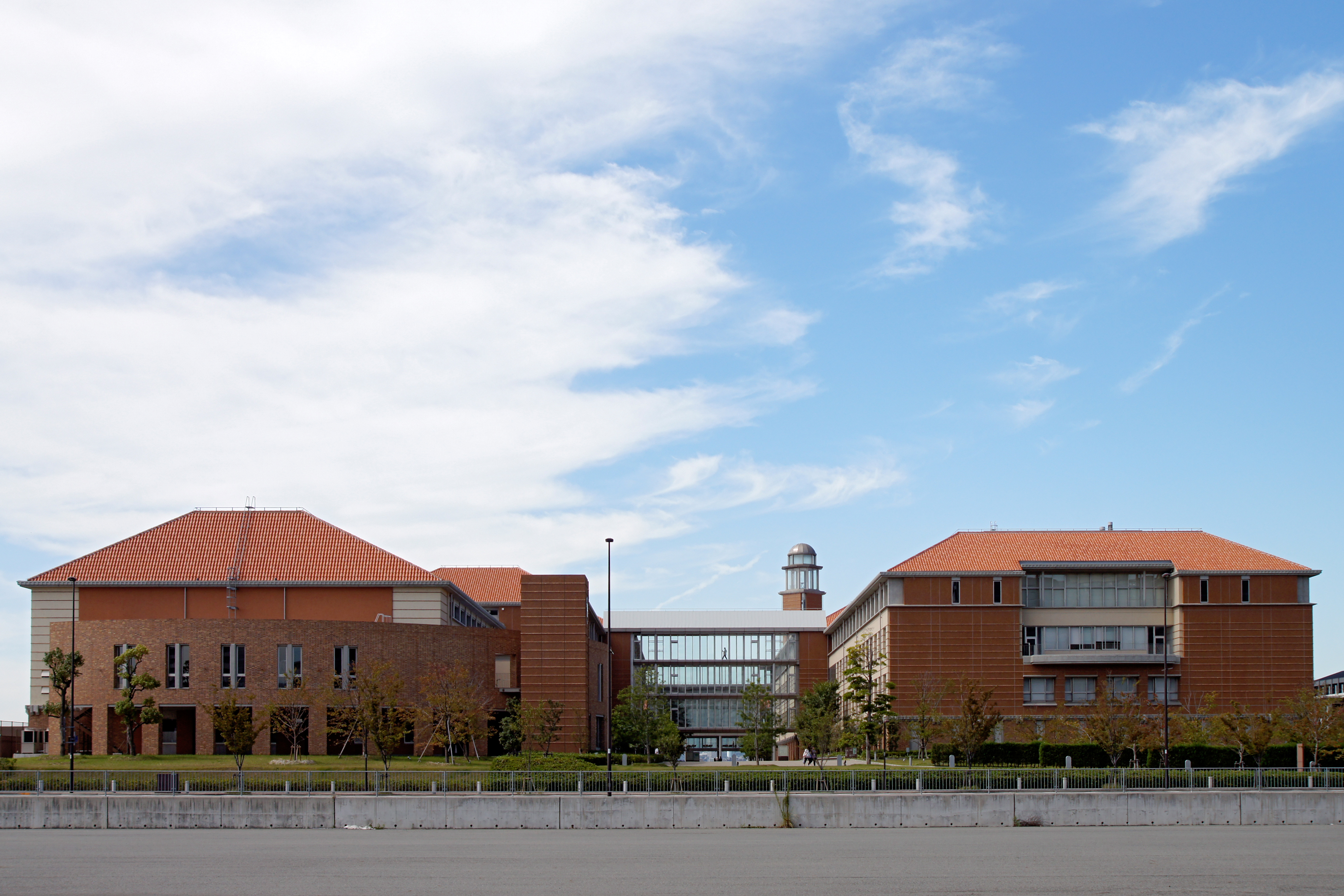
Hyogo University of Health Sciences

Hyogo University of Health Sciences (兵庫医療大学, Hyōgo iryō daigaku) is a private university in Kobe, Hyōgo, Japan, established in 2007.
