= Akashi District =

Former district in Hyōgo prefecture, Japan

Akashi District (明石郡, Akashi-gun) was a district in Hyōgo Prefecture. It was formed in 1879 from the territory of the Edo period Akashi Domain. The district ceased to exist on 10 January 1951, when its last remaining municipalities merged into Akashi city. The area that the district once covered is now within Akashi city and western Kobe city.

== History ==
At the beginning of the Meiji era, the Akashi Domain consisted of the town of Akashi and 144 villages. In July 1871 the feudal system of domains and provinces was abolished and Akashi Domain became Akashi Prefecture. In November of the same year Akashi Prefecture merged into Himeji Prefecture, and a few days later it changed its name into Shikama Prefecture. In August 1876 Shikama merged into Hyogo Prefecture. On 8 January 1879 the national law on districts, wards, towns and villages was put into effect in Hyogo Prefecture and the district of Akashi was formed. The district's administration was located in Akashi town. When a new law on towns and villages came into effect in April 1889, the towns and villages of Akashi District underwent various mergers to form the following twelve towns and villages:

- Akashi town
- Hasetani village
- Hayashizaki village
- Hirano village
- Ikawadani village
- Iwaoka village
- Kande village
- Ōkubo village
- Oshibedani village
- Tamatsu village
- Tarumi village
- Uozumi village

On 1 November 1919 Akashi town gained city status and broke away from the district, leaving the eleven villages. In the 1920s a series of changes to laws on local government saw districts in Japan lose their administrative powers, first by the dissolution of district councils in 1923, then the dissolution of district offices in 1926. At this time, districts remained only as a geographical area that was mainly used in the addressing of mail sent to towns and villages.

In November 1928 Tarumi gained status as a town, followed by Ōkubo in April 1938. In July 1941 Tarumi merged into Kobe city, and Hayashizaki merged into Akashi in February 1942. In 1943 Tamatsu and Akashi submitted an application for a merger, but it was rejected. Instead, in March 1947 Tamatsu and six other villages (Hasetani, Hirano, Ikawadani, Kande and Oshibedani) merged into Kobe. On 10 January 1951, Ōkubo and Uozumi merged into Akashi city and the district ceased to exist, with all of its former towns and villages now within the cities Akashi and Kobe.
