= Kobe City University of Foreign Studies =

Municipal university in Japan

Coordinates: 34°40′47″N 135°03′37″E

- 神戸市外国語大学
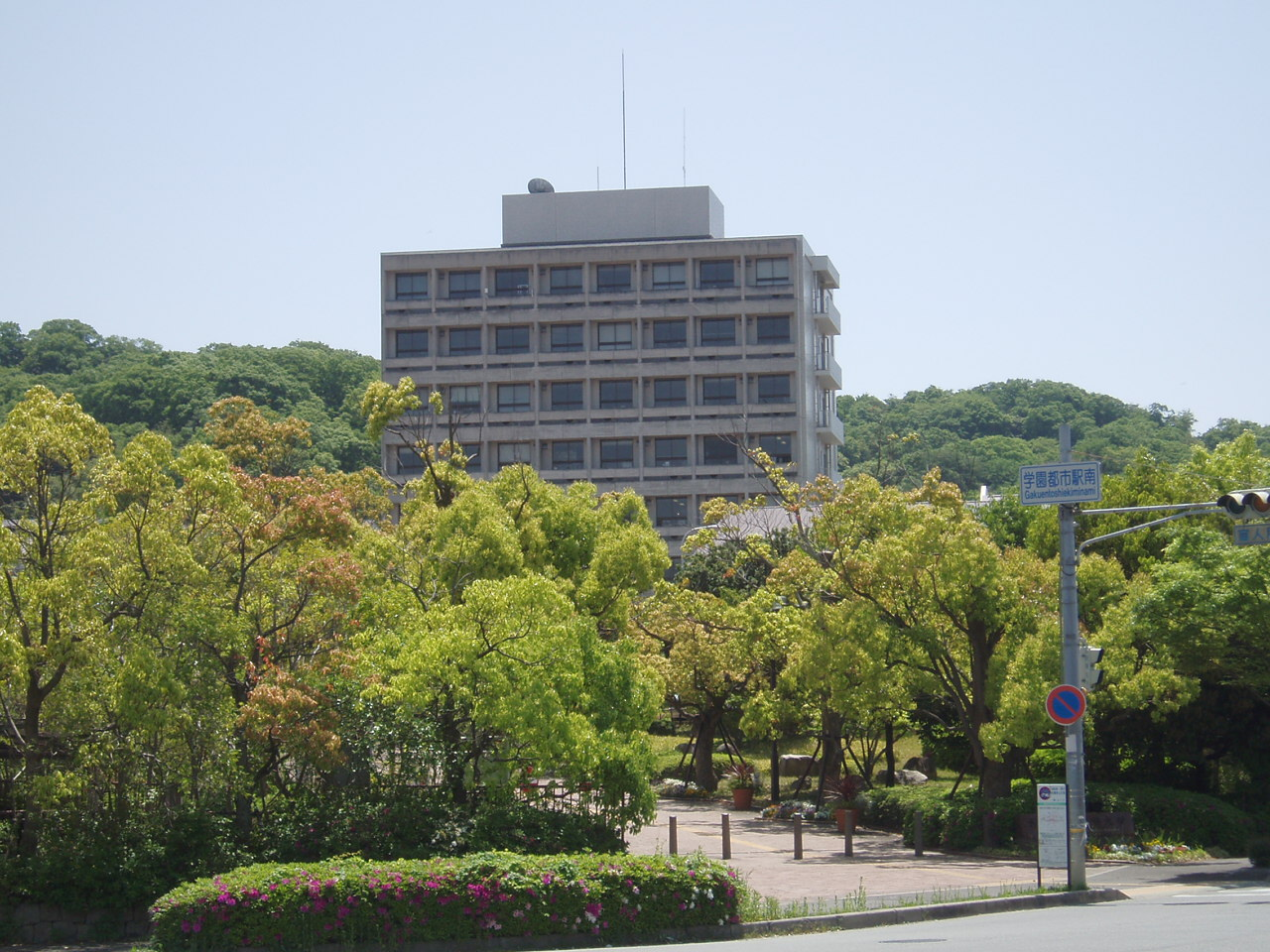
- Type: Public
- Established: Founded 1946; Chartered 1949
- Academic staff: 89 full-time
- Students: 2,312
- Undergraduates: 2,187
- Postgraduates: 125
- Doctoral students: 50
- Location: Kobe, Hyogo, Japan
- Campus: Suburb
- Website: www.kobe-cufs.ac.jp

Kobe City University of Foreign Studies (神戸市外国語大学, Kōbe-shi gaikokugo daigaku), KCUFS (神戸外大, Kōbe gaidai) for short, is a municipal university in Japan. It is located in Gakuen-higashimachi, Nishi-ku, Kobe City.

== History ==
It was founded in 1946 as Kobe Municipal College of Foreign Affairs (神戸市立外事専門学校, Kōbe shiritsu gaiji semmon gakkō), a coeducational college with a three-year curriculum. Kobe City was heavily damaged in World War II, and it founded the college to help restore the port city.

The college had five departments: English and American Studies, Russian Studies, Chinese Studies, Spanish Studies, and International Relations. The first campus was located in Daikai-dori, Hyogo-ku; the school buildings were those of Daikai Elementary School, which had few pupils at that time. In 1947 the college moved to Onogara-dori, Fukiai-ku (Chuo-ku now).

In April 1949 the college was developed into Kobe City University of Foreign Studies, a four-year university under Japan's new educational system. A new campus was opened on a hill called Kusu-ga-oka (楠ヶ丘) in Nada-ku.

The latter history of KCUFS is as follows:

- 1953: Evening courses (Department of English and American Studies) were added.
- 1962: Department of Spanish Studies was added.
- 1967: Master's courses were added.
- 1986: KCUFS moved to present-day "Academic Town" Campus (in Nishi-ku).
  The former Kusunoki-ga-oka Campus is now the campus of Shinwa Junior & Girls' Senior High School.
- 1987: Department of International Relations was added.
- 1996: Doctoral courses (International Cultural Studies) were added.

== Undergraduate courses ==
- Department of English and American Studies
- Department of Russian Studies
- Department of Chinese Studies
- Department of Spanish Studies
- Department of International Relations
- Evening Courses (Department of English and American Studies)

== Graduate schools ==
Master's courses

- Division of English Language Studies
- Division of Russian Language Studies
- Division of Chinese Language Studies
- Division of Spanish Language Studies
- Division of International Relations
- Division of Japanese and Asian Languages and Culture
- Division of English Education

Doctoral courses

- International Cultural Studies

== Institutes ==
- Academic Information Center (Library)
- Institute for Foreign Studies
- Institute for the professors
- Institute of the main office
- Institute for students (Cafeteria)
