= Luke Gillespie =

American musician (born 1957)

Luke Gillespie (born April 16, 1957) is an American jazz and classical pianist.

== Early life and education ==
Born in Kyoto, Japan, Gillespie grew up in Osaka. He attended Canadian Academy, an international school in Kobe, Japan. He lived in Ft. Worth, Texas, in 1st grade, and Memphis, Tennessee, in 6th grade. Returning to the US for college, Gillespie majored in Music Performance at Indiana University, studying Jazz and Classical Piano, Music History and Comparative Arts and Literature. He studied classical piano with Yoshiko Sato, a professor at Osaka College of Music from age 8 to 18. He also studied both jazz (bachelor's, in 1979, and master's, in 1985, degrees with David Baker) and classical piano (master's and doctor's degrees with Michel Block and Leonard Hokanson, a student of Artur Schnabel) at Indiana University School of Music (now named the Jacobs School of Music.)

== Professional career ==
Gillespie is an active performer of jazz and classical piano music. He also teaches at various jazz camps, and jazz festivals around the country. Gillespie has been the recipient of many prestigious awards such as best performance from the Indianapolis Star in 1993, the 1990 Copland Piano Concerto Competition winner at Indiana University, and the 1994 Indianapolis Jazz Festival Competition award.

He has recorded with the Arts Center Jazz Collective, David Baker, Bruce Bransby, Buselli-Wallarab Jazz Orchestra, James Campbell, Steve Davis (drums), Everett Greene, Sylvia McNair, Dan Perantoni, Eugene Rousseau, Dominic Spera, Wanda Stafford, and Tom Walsh (with whom he toured Europe in May 2002–03, Japan in May 2004–05, and China in May 2009). He has performed with Jamey Aebersold, Eric Alexander, Ron Blake, Benny Golson, Wycliffe Gordon, Bunky Green, Jimmy Heath, Steve Houghton, Ingrid Jensen, Kelley Johnson, Pat LaBarbera, David Liebman, James Moody, Ed Neumeister, Chris Potter, Rufus Reid, Arturo Sandoval, Jim Snidero, Rodney Whitaker, the Smithsonian Jazz Masterworks Orchestra and Pablo Ziegler.

== Discography ==
- 'Footprints (RIAX, 2003)
- Live at the Station (Watercourse, 2009)
- Moving Mists ( Patois, July 12, 2019)
