= Marine Park Station =

Railway station in Kobe, Hyogo prefecture, Japan

Marine Park Station マリンパーク駅
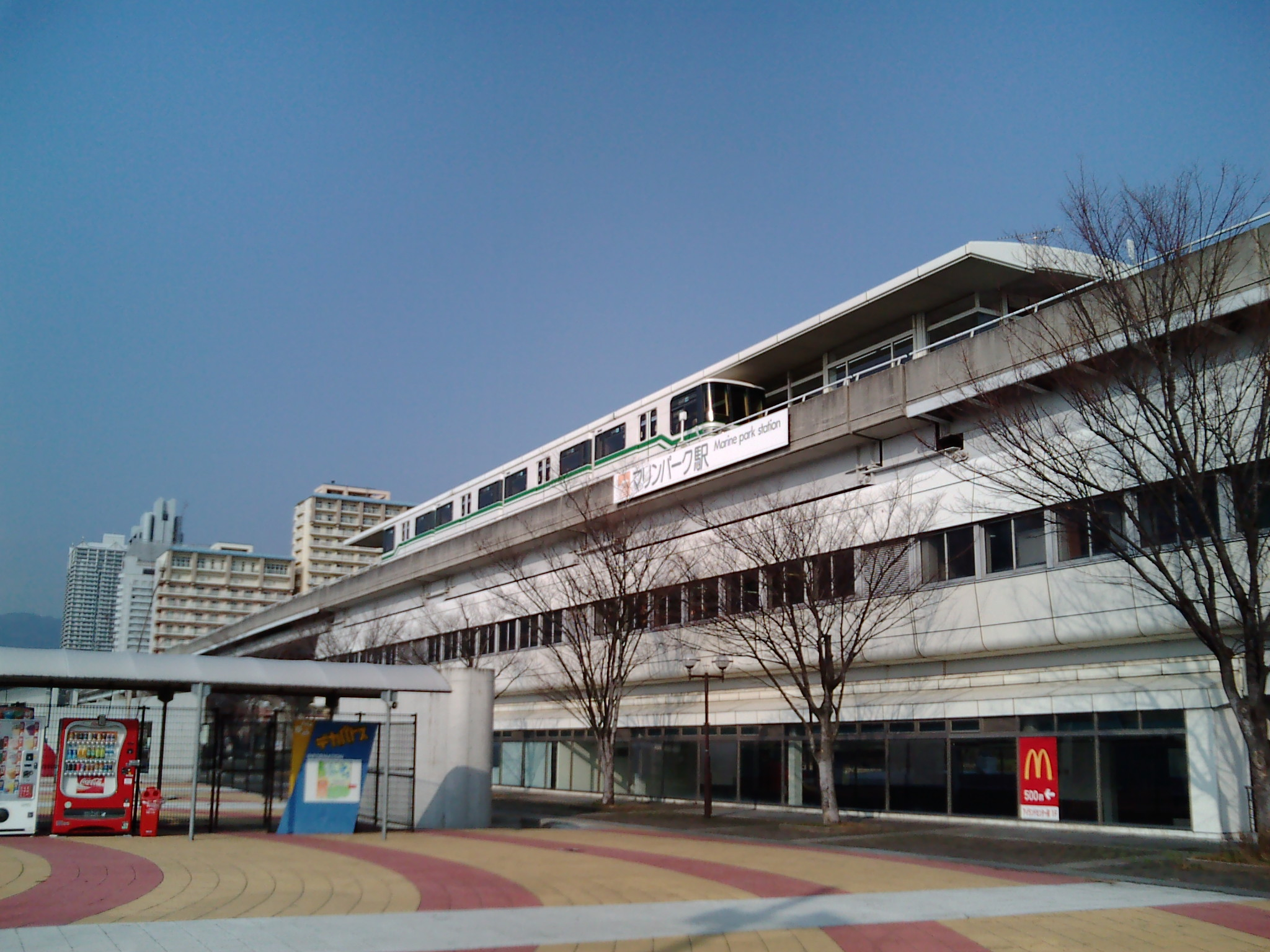

General information
- Location: 4 Kōyōchō Naka, Higashinada-ku, Kobe, Hyōgo Prefecture; Japan
- Coordinates: 34.6843°N 135.2701°E
- Operator: Kobe New Transit
- Line: Rokko Island Line

Other information
- Station code: R06

History
- Opened: February 21, 1990
Location

Marine Park Station (マリンパーク駅, Marin Pāku eki) is a railway station on the Rokko Island Line in Kobe, Hyōgo Prefecture, Japan, operated by Kobe New Transit. It is the final stop for southbound trains originating at Sumiyoshi Station.

== Lines ==
Marine Park Station is served by the Rokko Island Line automated guideway transit, and is located 4.5 kilometers from the terminus of the line at Sumiyoshi Station.

== Station layout ==
Marine Park Station has a single island platform.

=== Platforms ===
1-2	■ Rokko Island Line	for Sumiyoshi

== Adjacent stations ==
«	Service	»
Rokko Island Line (R06)
Island Center (R05)	-	Terminus

== History ==
Marine Park Station opened on February 21, 1990.

== Surrounding area ==
The station is located directly next to Dekapatosu Water Park and Rokko Island High School. It is also walking distance from Canadian Academy. The previous station on the Rokkoliner, Island Center Station, is 500 meters to the north of the station.
