= Sumiyoshi Station (JR West) =

Railway station in Kobe, Japan

Coordinates: 34°43′11″N 135°15′44″E

Sumiyoshi Station 住吉駅
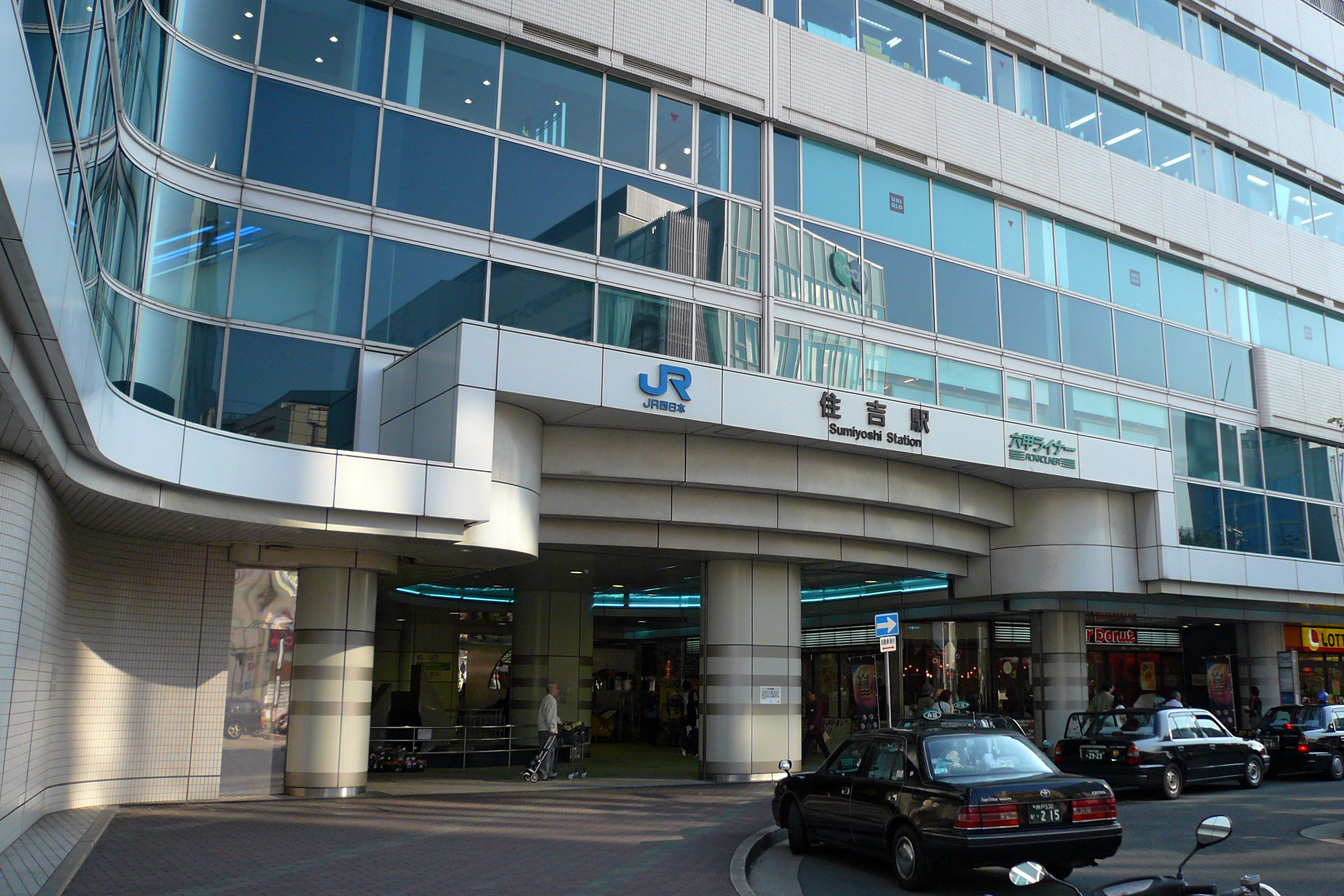
- Sumiyoshi Station, October 2007

General information
- Location: 1-2-9 Sumiyoshi-honmachi, Higashinada-ku, Kobe-shi, Hyōgo-ken 658-0051; Japan
- Owner: JR West Kobe New Transit
- Operator: JR West
- Line: Tōkaidō Main Line (JR Kobe Line) ■ Rokko Liner
- Distance: 580.1 km (360.5 miles) from Tokyo
- Platforms: 3 island platforms
- Connections: Bus stop

Construction
- Structure type: Elevated (JR West); Ground level (Rokkō Liner)
- Accessible: Yes

Other information
- Status: Staffed ( Midori no Madoguchi )
- Station code: JR-A57 (JR West); R-01 (Rokkō Liner)
- Website: Official website

History
- Opened: 1 June 1874

Passengers
- FY 2023; FY 2019: 64,002 daily (JR West); 13,577 daily boardings (Kobe New Transit)
Location
- Location within Hyōgo Prefecture Location within Japan

Sumiyoshi Station (住吉駅, Sumiyoshi-eki) is a junction passenger railway station located in Higashinada-ku, Kobe, Hyōgo Prefecture, Japan. It is operated by the West Japan Railway Company (JR West) and by the third sector Kobe New Transit Company

== Lines ==
Sumiyoshi Station is served by the Tōkaidō Main Line (JR Kobe Line), and is located 580.1 kilometers from the terminus of the line at Tokyo and 23.7 kilometers from Osaka. It is also the terminus of the 4.5 kilometer Rokkō Island Line, an automated guideway transit system to Marine Park on man-made Rokkō Island.

== Station layout ==
The JR station consists of two island platforms connected by an elevated station building. The two inside tracks are used by local and rapid service trains, and the two outside tracks by passing trains and a limited number of rapid trains. The station has a Midori no Madoguchi staffed ticket office. The Kobe New Transit station has one deadheaded island platform and is located above the JR platforms.

=== Platforms ===
1	■ JR Kobe Line	for commuter express and through traffic
2	■ JR Kobe Line	for Amagasaki, Osaka and Kitashinchi
3	■ JR Kobe Line	for Sannomiya and Himeji
4	■ JR Kobe Line	for commuter express and through traffic

1	■ Rokkō Liner	for Marine Park
2	■ Rokkō Liner	for Marine Park

== Adjacent stations ==
«	Service	»
JR West Tōkaidō Line (JR Kōbe Line)
Settsu-Motoyama (JR-A56)	Local	Rokkōmichi (JR-A58)
Ashiya (JR-A54)	Rapid Service	Rokkōmichi (JR-A58)
Special Rapid Service: Does not stop at this station
Rokkō Liner (R01)
Terminus	-	Uozaki (R02)

== History ==
Sumiyoshi Station opened on 1 June 1874. With the privatization of the Japan National Railways (JNR) on 1 April 1987, the station came under the aegis of the West Japan Railway Company. The Kobe New Transit began operations on 21 February 1991.

Station numbering was introduced to the Kobe Line platforms in March 2018 with Sumiyoshi being assigned station number JR-A57.

== Passenger statistics ==
In fiscal 2019, the JR station was used by an average of 35,612 passengers daily, and the Kobe New Transit station was used by 13,577 people in the same period.

== Surrounding area ==
- Higashinada Ward General Government Building (Higashinada Ward Office)
- Kobe Municipal Higashinada Library
- Nada Junior and Senior High School
- Konan Elementary School
- Kobe Municipal Sumiyoshi Elementary School
- Kobe Municipal Sumiyoshi Junior High School

== See also ==
- List of railway stations in Japan
