= CIS =

CIS may refer to:

== Computing ==
- Card information structure, formatting and organization data stored on a PC card
- Center for Internet Security, cybersecurity benchmarks, controls, practices and tools
- Center for Internet and Society (disambiguation)
- Comodo Internet Security suite
- CompuServe Information Service, a US commercial online service
- Computer and information science, a field that emphasizes both computing and informatics
- Computer information systems, technologies which process data to solve business problems
- Configuration interaction singles, a quantum-chemical method for computing electronic states
- Contact image sensor, a technology developed for optical flatbed scanners
- Continuous ink system, for ink-jet printers

== Education ==
- Calcutta International School, in India
- Canadian International School (disambiguation)
  - Canadian International School (Bangalore)
  - Canadian International School Vietnam
  - Canadian International School of Sanya, in China
  - Canadian International School (Singapore)
  - Canadian International School (Tokyo)
- Cayman International School in Grand Cayman, Cayman Islands
- Cebu International School, in the Philippines
- Chinese International School, in Hong Kong
- Clifford International School, in Guangzhou, Guangdong, China
- College in the Schools, a program for high school students run by the University of Minnesota, U.S.
- Colombo International School, in Sri Lanka
- Communities In Schools, a U.S. federation of organizations combating educational dropout
- Copenhagen International School, in Denmark
- Council of International Schools, an international educational community organizations
- MIT Center for International Studies, in Massachusetts, U.S.

== Health ==
- Cancer Information Service, a program of the US National Institutes of Health
- Carcinoma in situ, group of abnormal cells which may be cancer
- Clinically isolated syndrome, an initial neurological episode related to nerve tissue
- Combined intracavernous injection and stimulation test, a diagnostic procedure for erectile dysfunction

== Organizations ==
=== United States ===
- Center for Immigration Studies, an American anti-immigration think tank
- United States Citizenship and Immigration Services, a US government agency

=== British ===
- Christians in Science, a UK organization
- Co-operative Insurance Society, a British insurance company

=== Canadian ===
- Canadian Ice Service, a division of the Meteorological Service of Canada
- Canadian Identification Society, of police and civilians in crime scene investigation
- Canadian Interuniversity Sport, a former name of the national governing body of university sport

=== Eurasian ===
- Commonwealth of Independent States, a Eurasian intergovernmental organization
  - CIS national football team, a National association football team

=== Other ===
- Centre for Independent Studies, an Australian libertarian think tank
- Centro de Investigaciones Sociológicas, a Spanish public research institute
- CIS Corps (Ireland), Communications and Information Services Corps, Irish combat support corps
- Cisalpino, Swiss–Italian railway company (CIS in timetables)
- Commission Internationale de Surveillance du Plébiscite au Slesvig, an international commission set up for the 1920 Schleswig plebiscites
- Commonwealth Police (Commonwealth Investigation Service), an Australian security service, 1945 to 1960

== Other uses ==
- Canton Island Airport, Kanton Island, Phoenix Islands, Kiribati, IATA code
- Capital Indoor Stadium, an indoor arena in Beijing, China
- Case Information Statement, a document used in US civil lawsuits
- cis (mathematics), a trigonometric mathematical function
- CIS Tower, a building in Manchester, England
- Common Intelligibility Scale, for speech intelligibility
- Community Innovation Survey, a series of surveys throughout the European Union
- Confederacy of Independent Systems, a fictional entity in the Star Wars universe
- Continuous Injection System, a fuel injection system developed by the Robert Bosch Group
- Copper indium selenide (CuInSe_{2}), used in solar cells and semiconductors
- Corpus Inscriptionum Semiticarum, a corpus of Semitic inscriptions

== See also ==
- Cis (disambiguation)
- ACT-CIS Partylist, a political organization in the Philippines
