= SIB =

SIB or sib may refer to:

== Arts and media ==
- Sinar Indonesia Baru, a newspaper
- Systems in Blue, a German band
- "S.I.B. (Swelling Itching Brain)", a song from the 1979 Devo album Duty Now for the Future

== Businesses ==
- Savings and Investment Bank, a failed bank on the Isle of Man
- South Indian Bank
- Social Investment Business, UK charity

== Computing ==
- Service Implementation Bean, a Java object
- A scale-index-base byte in x86 processor

== Organisations ==
- School of International Business, Reutlingen University, Germany
- Scientex Incorporated Berhad, a Malaysian stretch film manufacturer
- Securities and Investments Board, UK later the Financial Services Authority
- Sekolah Indonesia Bangkok, an Indonesian school
- Sidang Injil Borneo, the Borneo Evangelical Church
- Special Investigation Branch of UK military police
- Special Investigations Branch of the New Zealand Defence Force Military Police
- Student Welfare Organisation in Bergen (Studentsamskipnaden i Bergen, SiB)
- Swiss Institute of Bioinformatics
- Special Investigations Bureau (disambiguation)

== Places ==
- Sib, Khuzestan, a village in Khuzestan Province, Iran
- As Sib, a town in Oman
- Sibiti Airport (IATA airport code), in the Republic of the Congo
- Sunny Isles Beach, Florida, US

== Science ==
- Sib (anthropology), a group of people recognized by an individual as kin
- Sib RNA, a non-coding sRNA found in E. coli
- Simple biosphere model, used with atmospheric general circulation models
- Self-injurious behaviour, in self-injury
