= Cover sheet =

Cover sheet may refer to:

- Case Information Statement (or Cover Sheet), is a document which is filed with a court clerk at the commencement of a civil lawsuit in many of the court systems of the United States
- Assignment cover sheet, a paper used by students when completing assignments at university for their courses
- Classified information cover sheets, brightly colored forms affixed to classified documents to identify them as sensitive and shield them from unauthorized access

== See also ==
- Cover letter
