= Sis =

Sis or SIS may refer to:

== People ==
- Michael Sis (born 1960), American Catholic bishop

== Places ==
- Sis (ancient city), historical town in modern-day Turkey, served as the capital of the Armenian Kingdom of Cilicia.
- Kozan, Adana, the current name of the Armenian town of Sis in Cilicia, Turkey
- Sis, Armenia, a village in Armenia
- Sis, Azerbaijan, a village in the Republic of Azerbaijan
- Sis, Iran, a city in East Azerbaijan, Iran
- Sis, Kurdistan, a village in Kurdistan, Iran
- Sis Rural District (Shabestar County), East Azerbaijan province, Iran
- Sis Rural District (Dehgolan County), Kurdistan province, Iran
- Mountains of Sis, a range of the Pre-Pyrenees

== Intelligence ==
- Schengen Information System, in Europe
- Security Information Service, Czech domestic information intelligence agency known as BIS
- Secret Intelligence Service, the British foreign intelligence service, also known as MI6
- Australian Secret Intelligence Service, Australia’s national intelligence service
- Canadian Security Intelligence Service, Canada's national intelligence service
- New Zealand Security Intelligence Service, an intelligence agency of the New Zealand government
- Finnish Security Intelligence Service, the intelligence agency of Finland in charge of national security
- Slovenská informačná služba, Slovak Intelligence Service
- Special Intelligence Service, a secret FBI intelligence agency operating in South America during World War II
- Signals Intelligence Service, the former United States Army codebreaking division
- Information and Security Service of the Republic of Moldova, the principal intelligence agency of Moldova.
- Serviço de Informações de Segurança, a Portuguese intelligence agency
- Survey of India Service, formerly the Great Trigonometric Survey
- Special Investigation Section, a tactical detective and surveillance unit of the Los Angeles Police Department
- Signals Intelligence Section, involved with the Magic project during World War II

== Businesses ==
- Silicon Integrated Systems, an electronics manufacturing company
- Sports Information Services, a news service company
- Siemens IT Solutions and Services, a service provider which is part of Siemens AG headquarters
- SIS (motorbikes), a Portuguese manufacturer of motorcycles

== Schools ==
=== China ===
- Shekou International School, in Shekou
- Singapore International School, in Hong Kong
- South Island School, in Hong Kong

=== United States ===
- School of International Service, American University, Washington, D.C.
- Syracuse University School of Information Studies
- University of Pittsburgh School of Information Sciences

=== Other schools ===
- SIS Swiss International School, a group of 15 private day schools in Switzerland, Germany and Brazil
- McGill University School of Information Studies, Canada
- School of International Studies of the Dresden University of Technology, Germany
- Singapore International School Mumbai, India
- Surabaya International School, Indonesia
- Seoul International School, South Korea
- Stockholm International School, Sweden
- Sharjah Indian School, United Arab Emirates

== Other organizations ==
- Sisters in Islam, an organization based in Malaysia
- Swedish Institute for Standards
- Specialized Information Services, a division of the United States National Library of Medicine
- State Information Service, official media and public relations apparatus of the Egyptian state

== Information processing ==
- SIS (file format), Symbian OS filename extension
- Short integer solution problem, a problem in lattice-based cryptography
- Single-instance storage, information-storage space-saving mechanism
- Strategic information system, a part of corporate strategy
- Student information system, a software application for education establishments to manage student data
- Sequential Importance Sampling

== Biological sciences ==
- Small intestinal submucosa, transplantation tissue
- Second-impact syndrome, synergy in concussions
- Sex in space, an area of biological research

== Healthcare ==
- Saline infusion sonography, a test used to diagnose uterine polyps
- Shoulder impingement syndrome, tendinitis of the shoulder

== Technologies ==
- Selective inverted sink, frost protection device
- Safety instrumented system or safety instrumentation system
- Space Infrastructure Servicing, a robotic spacecraft for in-space refueling of communication satellites
- Sequential infiltration synthesis, a method to infiltrate polymers to create inorganic-organic hybrid materials

== Other uses ==
- SIS (group), South Korean girl group founded 2017
- SiS (TV series), a morning talk show
- SIS, a 2008 television film directed by John Herzfeld
- Supervised injection site
- MS Sis, car ferry
- Singular isothermal sphere profile, a simple density distribution used in astronomy
- Silicon monosulfide, chemical formula SiS
- SIS (Soft Is Strong), 2024 EP by Katseye

== See also ==
- Sister, a female sibling
- Sissy, a pejorative term for a boy or man who violates or does not meet the traditional male gender role
- Shimano Index Shifting, bicycle transmission design
- Single-image stereogram
- Superconductor-insulator-superconductor tunnel junction
- Swedish National Board of Institutional Care, abbreviated SiS
- SIS 18, an accelerator at the GSI Helmholtz Centre for Heavy Ion Research
- Special Investigations Section (disambiguation)
- Cis (disambiguation)
- Ciss (disambiguation)
