= Japan Council of International Schools =

The Japan Council of International Schools (JCIS) is an association of international schools in Japan. All member schools provide education in English. The smallest JCIS member school has fewer than 100 students and the largest has more than 1,500.

Heads of JCIS schools communicate on both a day-to-day basis about matters of common interest. Topics range from reviews of service providers and employment legislation to dealing with pandemics (bird flu, swine influenza) and natural disasters. Regular meetings are held for heads and curriculum coordinators at JCIS member schools throughout the year. Schools also the costs of visiting speakers or performers. The council also offers subsidies to promote collaborative professional development within the JCIS community.

In addition, council members often collaborate on projects, such as coordinating volunteer efforts after the 2011 Tōhoku earthquake and tsunami and publishing a book of teaching activities for Japanese classes in 1997.

== History ==
Since 1872, schools offering an education in English and serving the expatriate community have existed in Japan. Four current JCIS member schools can trace their origins to before the First World War. The number of schools burgeoned in the 1950s and 1960s. When school representatives met for the first time in October 1965, they discovered that they shared many of the same problems.

The Japanese Council of Overseas Schools (JCOS) was established in 1972. At first, membership was only open to East Asia Regional Council of Overseas Schools (EARCOS) in Japan. In 1982, membership was widened to include any school that offered its curriculum in English. In 1987, the name was changed to the Japan Council of International Schools, or JCIS, to mirror the European Council of International Schools (ECIS).

== Member schools ==
The following schools are members of the Council:

- American School in Japan
- Aoba-Japan International School
- The British School in Tokyo
- Canadian Academy
- Canadian International School
- Christian Academy in Japan
- Columbia International School
- Fukuoka International School
- Hiroshima International School
- Hokkaido International School
- International School of the Sacred Heart
- K. International School Tokyo
- Kyoto International School
- Marist Brothers International School
- The Montessori School of Tokyo
- Nagoya International School
- New International School
- Nishimachi International School
- Osaka International School
- Osaka YMCA International School
- Saint Maur International School
- St. Mary's International School
- St. Michael's International School
- Seisen International School
- Tohoku International School
- Tokyo International School
- Tsukuba International School
- Yokohama International School
