= Kansai region =

Region of Japan

Coordinates: 35°N 135°E

Kansai region 関西地方
- Region
- The Kansai region in Japan

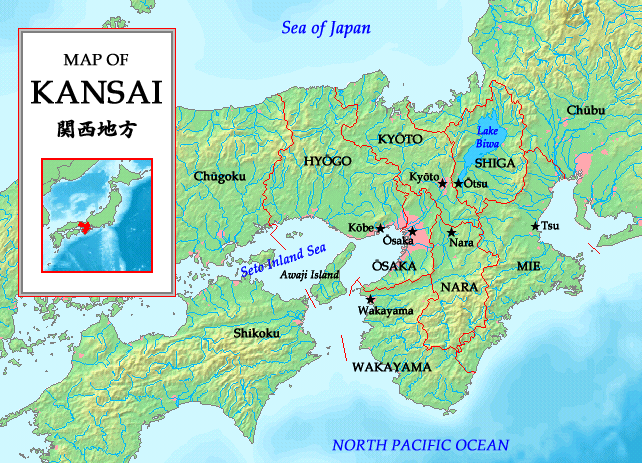
- Kansai region with prefectures
- Interactive map of Kansai region
- Country: Japan

Area
  - Total: 33,124.82 km^{2} (12,789.56 sq mi)

Population (1 October 2025)
  - Total: 21,811,927
  - Density: 658.4768/km^{2} (1,705.447/sq mi)
- Demonym: Japanese

GDP (2022)
  - Total: JP￥92.617 trillion US$684 billion
- Time zone: UTC+9 (JST)

The Kansai region (Japanese: 関西地方, Hepburn: Kansai Chihō; Japanese pronunciation), a.k.a. Kinki region (近畿地方, Kinki Chihō), (Note: [k̟ʲíŋ̟ʲ.k̟ʲì, k̟ʲìŋ̟́ʲ.k̟ʲi̥ c̟͡ɕí.hò̞ò̞, -c̟͡ɕi̥.hò̞ò̞, -c̟͡ɕi̥.hó̞ò̞, k̟ʲíŋ̟́ʲ.k̟ʲi̥-, k̟ʲíŋ̟́ʲ.k̟ʲi-]) is a region of Japan that lies in the southern-central portion of Japan's main island, Honshū. The region consists of the prefectures of Hyōgo, Kyoto, Mie, Nara, Osaka, Shiga, and Wakayama.

Kansai is the second-most populated region of Japan (after Kantō), and contains the metropolitan region of Osaka, Kobe and Kyoto (Keihanshin region), which is the second-most populated metropolitan region in Japan (after the Greater Tokyo Area).

== Name ==
The terms Kansai (関西), Kinki (近畿), and Kinai (畿内) have their roots during the Asuka period. When the old provinces of Japan were established, several provinces in the area around the then-capital Yamato Province were collectively named Kinai and Kinki, both roughly meaning "the neighbourhood of the capital".

Kansai (literally west of the tollgate) in its original usage refers to the land west of the Osaka Tollgate (逢坂関), the border between Yamashiro Province and Ōmi Province (present-day Kyoto and Shiga prefectures). During the Kamakura period, this border was redefined to include Ōmi and Iga Provinces. It is not until the Edo period that Kansai came to acquire its current form. (see Kamigata)

While the use of the terms "Kansai" and "Kinki" have changed over history, in most modern contexts the use of the two terms is interchangeable. The term "Kinai", once synonymous with Kinki, now refers to the Kyoto–Osaka–Kobe (Keihanshin) area at the center of the Kansai region. Like all regions of Japan, the Kansai region is not an administrative unit, but rather a cultural and historical one, which emerged much later during the Heian period after the expansion of Japan saw the development of the Kantō region to the east and the need to differentiate what was previously the center of Japan in Kansai emerged.

=== "Kinki" from an international perspective ===
The name "Kinki" is pronounced similarly to the English word "kinky", which means "twisted" or "perverted". This has become a problem due to internationalization, and some organizations have changed their name as a result.

In April 2016, Kinki University (近畿大学, Kinki Daigaku) changed its English name to Kindai University. Keizai sangyō-kyoku (経済産業局, Kinki Bureau of Economy) uses "Kansai" in English notation, and Kinki Unyukyoku (近畿運輸局, Kinki Transport Bureau) also uses "Kansai" in English notation since 2015. The Kinki shōkō kaigi-sho rengō-kai (近畿商工会議所連合会, Kinki Chamber of Commerce and Industry Association) changed its name to "Kansai Chamber of Commerce and Industry Association" in July 2015.

In the fall of 2014, Kansai Keizai Rengōkai (公益社団法人関西経済連合会, Kansai Economic Federation) asked the government to unify the name of the local agency to "Kansai". In June 2003, the English name of the major private railway company Kintetsu Railway was changed from Kinki Nippon Railway Co., Ltd. to the official abbreviation Kintetsu Corporation. In April 2015, it was changed again to Kintetsu Railway Co., Ltd..

== Overview ==
A topographic map of Kansai

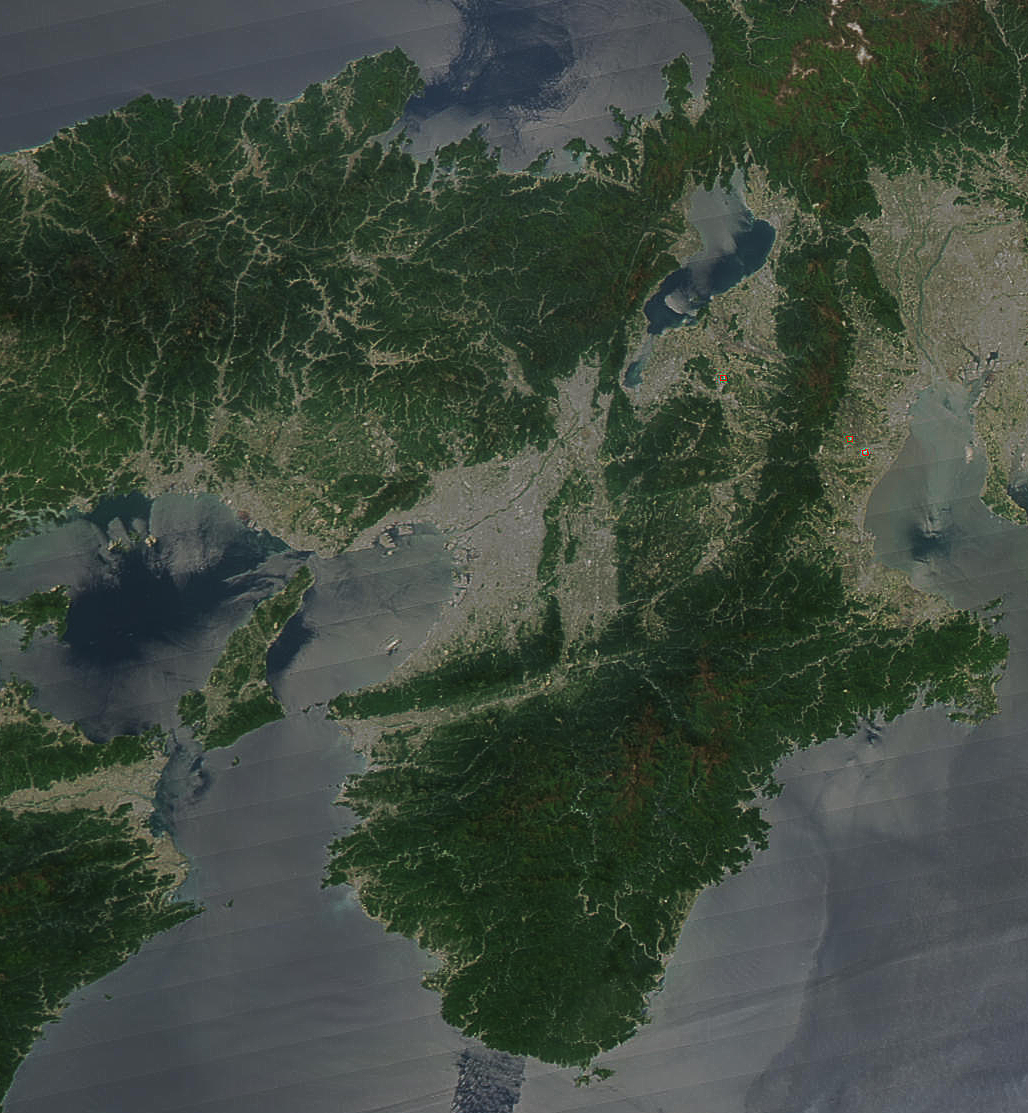
A satellite photo of the Kansai region

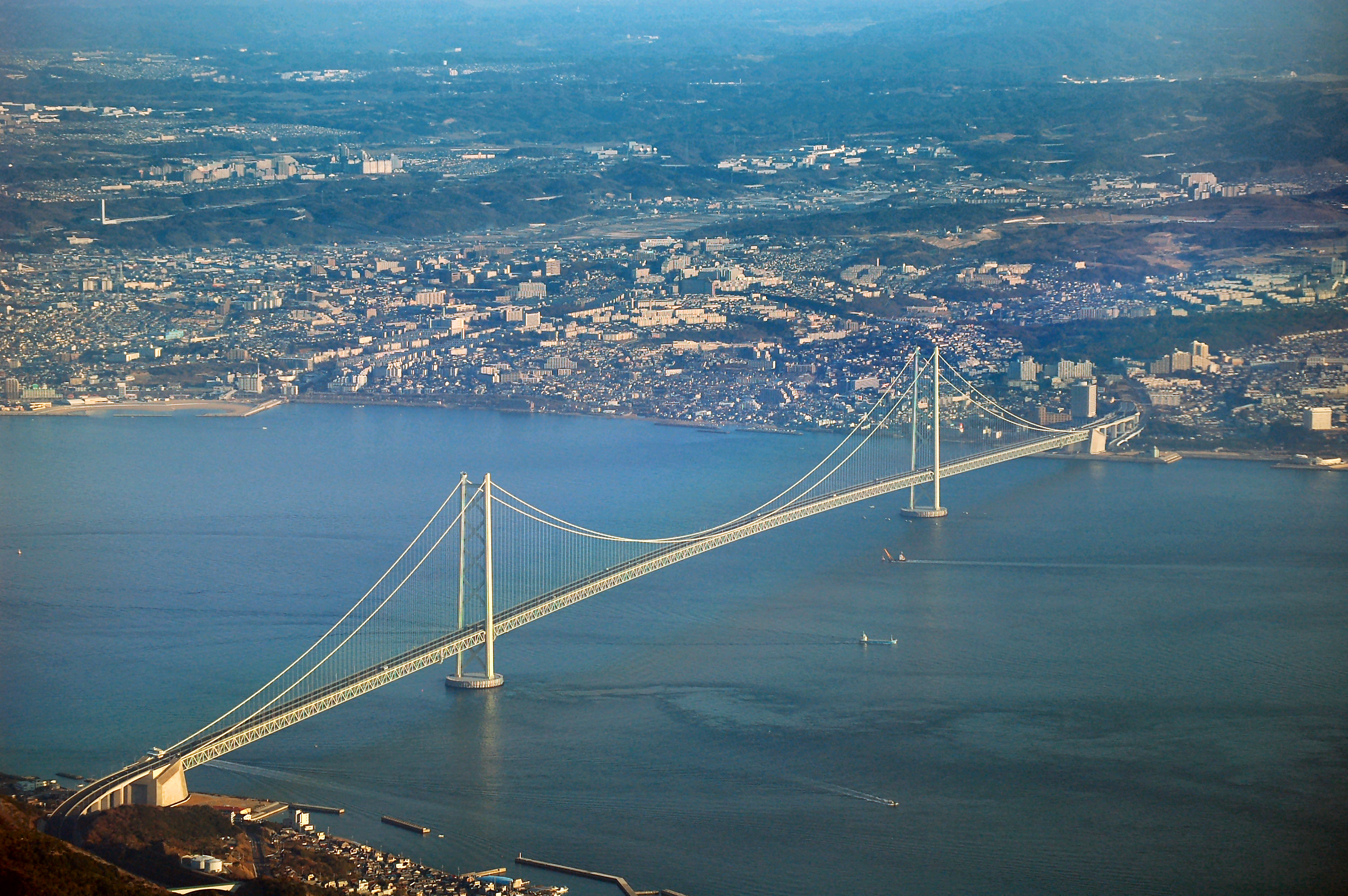
The Akashi Kaikyō Bridge, the longest suspension bridge in the world until 2022, with a centre span of 1,991 m

The Kansai region is a cultural center and the historical heart of Japan, with 11% of the nation's land area and 22,757,897 residents in 2010. The Osaka Plain with the cities of Osaka and Kyoto forms the core of the region. From there the Kansai area stretches west along the Seto Inland Sea towards Kobe and Himeji, and east encompassing Lake Biwa, Japan's largest freshwater lake. In the north, the region is bordered by the Sea of Japan, to the south by the Kii Peninsula and the Pacific Ocean, and to the east by the Ibuki Mountains and Ise Bay.

Four of Japan's national parks lie within its borders, in whole or in part. The area contains six of the seven top prefectures in terms of national treasures. Other geographical features include Amanohashidate in Kyoto Prefecture and Awaji Island in Hyōgo.

The Kansai region is often compared with the Kantō region, which lies to its east and consists primarily of Tokyo and the surrounding area. Whereas the Kantō region is symbolic of standardization throughout Japan, the Kansai region displays many more idiosyncrasies – the culture in Kyoto, the mercantilism of Osaka, the history of Nara, or the cosmopolitanism of Kobe – and represents the focus of counterculture in Japan. This East-West rivalry has deep historical roots, particularly from the Edo period. With a samurai population of less than 1% the culture of the merchant city of Osaka stood in sharp contrast to that of Edo, the seat of power for the Tokugawa shogunate.

Many characteristic traits of Kansai people descend from Osaka merchant culture. Catherine Maxwell, an editor for the newsletter Omusubi, writes: "Kansai residents are seen as being pragmatic, entrepreneurial, down-to-earth and possessing a strong sense of humor. Kantō people, on the other hand, are perceived as more sophisticated, reserved and formal, in keeping with Tokyo's history and modern status as the nation's capital and largest metropolis."

Kansai is known for its food, especially Osaka, as supported by the saying "Kyotoites are ruined by overspending on clothing, Osakans are ruined by overspending on food." (京の着倒れ、大阪の食い倒れ, Kyō no Kidaore, Ōsaka no Kuidaore). Popular Osakan dishes include takoyaki, okonomiyaki, kitsune udon and kushikatsu. Kyoto is considered a mecca of traditional Japanese cuisine like kaiseki. Kansai has many wagyu brands such as Kobe beef and Tajima cattle from Hyōgo, Matsusaka beef from Mie and Ōmi beef from Shiga. Sake is another specialty of the region, the areas of Nada-Gogō and Fushimi produce 45% of all sake in Japan. As opposed to food from Eastern Japan, food in the Kansai area tends to be sweeter, and foods such as nattō tend to be less popular.

The dialects of the people from the Kansai region, commonly called Kansai-ben, have their own variations of pronunciation, vocabulary, and grammar. Kansai-ben is the group of dialects spoken in the Kansai area, but is often treated as a dialect in its own right.

Kansai is one of the most prosperous areas for baseball in Japan. Two Nippon Professional Baseball teams, Hanshin Tigers and Orix Buffaloes, are based in Kansai. Koshien Stadium, the home stadium of the Hanshin Tigers, is also famous for the nationwide high school baseball tournaments. In association football, the Kansai Soccer League was founded in 1966 and currently has 16 teams in two divisions. Cerezo Osaka, Gamba Osaka, and Vissel Kobe belong to J. League Division 1 and Kyoto Sanga F.C. belongs to J. League Division 2, the top professional leagues in Japan.

== History ==
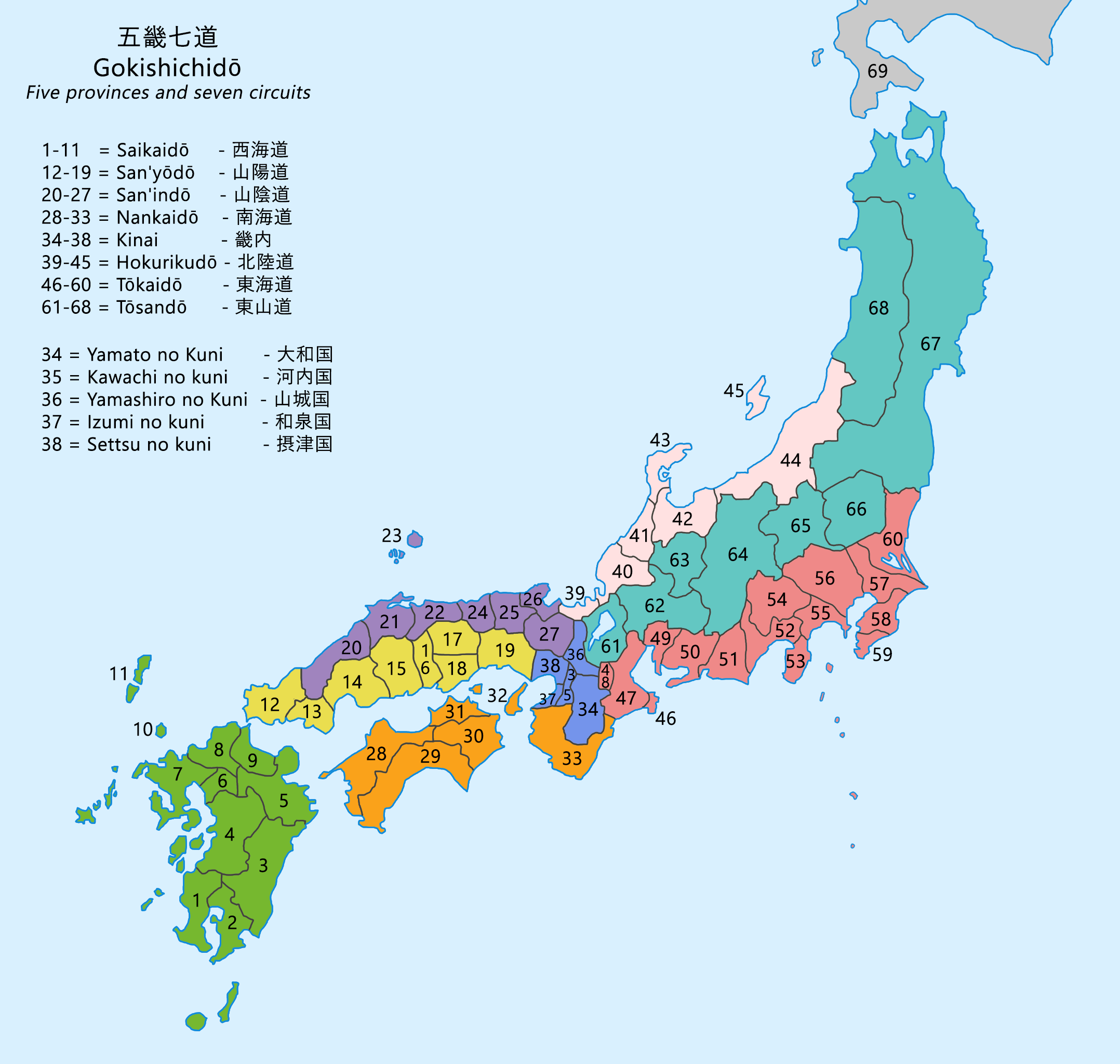
A map of provinces and circuits in 8th-century Japan

As a part of the Ritsuryō reforms of the seventh and eighth centuries, the provinces of Yamato, Yamashiro, Kawachi, Settsu, and Izumi were established by the Gokishichidō. These provinces were collectively referred to as Kinai or Kinki.

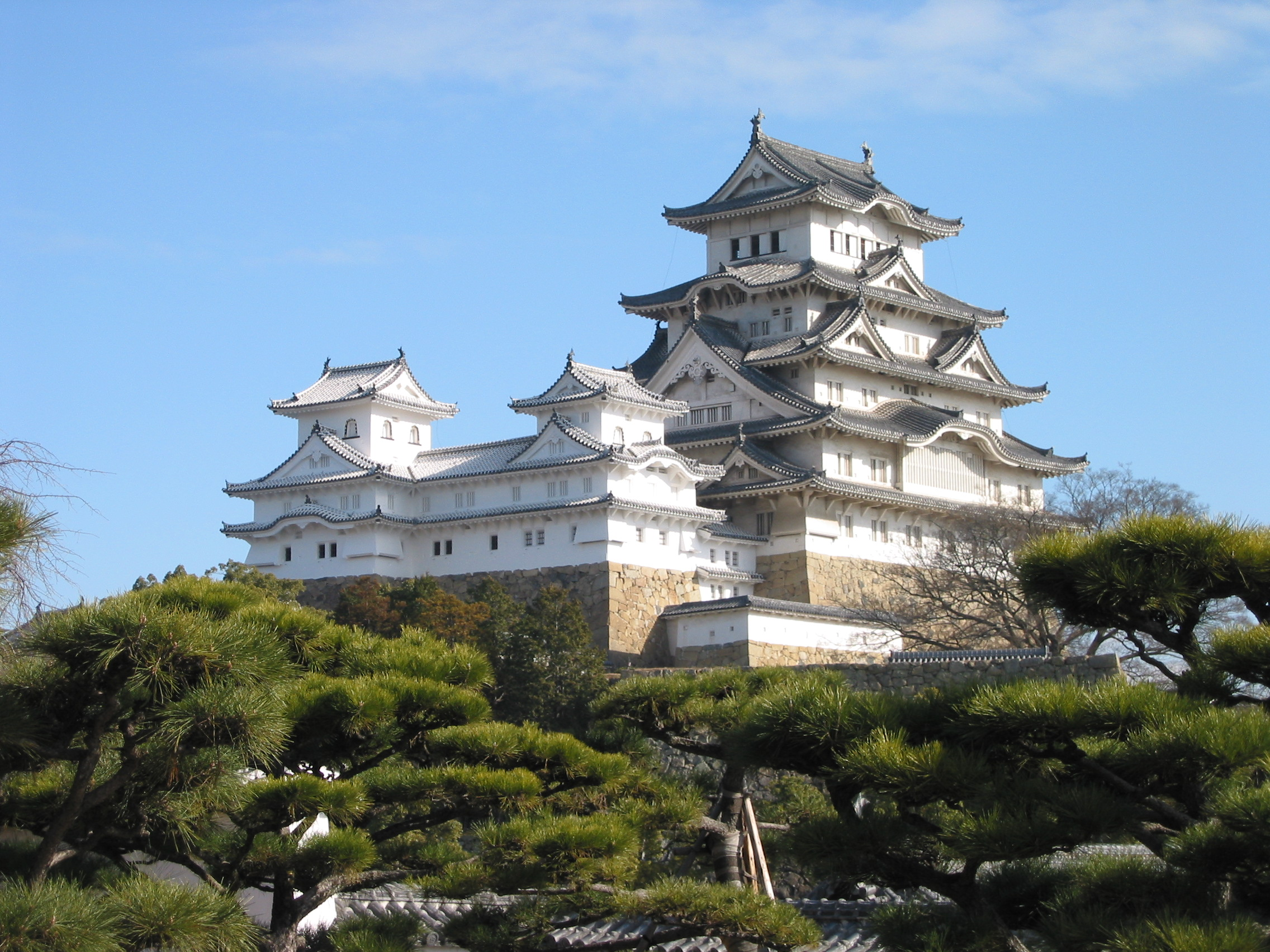
Himeji Castle

The Kansai region lays claim to the earliest beginnings of Japanese civilization. It was Nara, the most eastern point on the Silk Road, that became the site of Japan's first permanent capital. This period (AD 710–784) saw the spread of Buddhism to Japan and the construction of Tōdai-ji in 745. The Kansai region has the Shinto religion's holiest shrine at Ise Shrine (built in 690 AD) in Mie prefecture.

The Heian period saw the capital moved to Heian-kyō (平安京, present-day Kyoto), where it remained for over a thousand years until the Meiji Restoration. During this golden age, the Kansai region gave birth to traditional Japanese culture. In 788, Saicho, the founder of the Tendai sect of Buddhism established his monastery at Mount Hiei in Shiga Prefecture.

Japan's most famous tale, and some say the world's first novel, The Tale of Genji was penned by Murasaki Shikibu while performing as a lady-in-waiting in Heian-kyo. Noh and Kabuki, Japan's traditional dramatic forms both saw their birth and evolution in Kyoto. Bunraku, Japanese puppet theater, is native to Osaka.

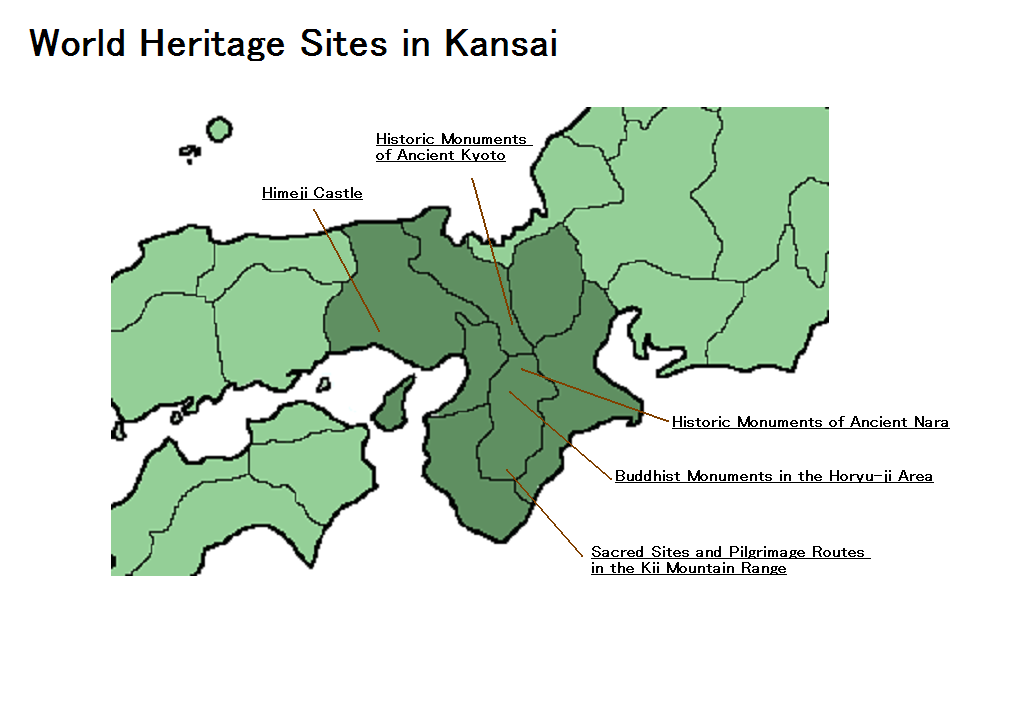
World Heritage Sites in Kansai region

Kansai's unique position in Japanese history, plus the lack of damage from wars or natural disasters, has resulted in Kansai region having more UNESCO World Heritage Listings than any other region of Japan. The five World Heritage Listings include: Buddhist Monuments in the Hōryū-ji Area, Himeji Castle, Historic Monuments of Ancient Kyoto (Kyoto, Uji and Otsu Cities), Historic Monuments of Ancient Nara, and Sacred Sites and Pilgrimage Routes in the Kii Mountain Range.

== Demographics ==
Per Japanese census data, Kansai region much like Keihanshin has experienced a small population decline beginning around 2010.

Historical population
Year	Pop.	±%
1920	9,212,000	—
1930	11,015,000	+19.6%
1940	13,133,000	+19.2%
1950	13,118,000	−0.1%
1960	15,515,000	+18.3%
1970	18,944,000	+22.1%
1980	21,208,000	+12.0%
1990	22,206,000	+4.7%
2000	22,712,924	+2.3%
2010	22,757,897	+0.2%
2020	22,311,695	−2.0%

== Major cities ==
- Kobe: a designated city, the capital of Hyōgo Prefecture
- Kyoto: a designated city, the capital of Kyoto Prefecture, formerly the Imperial capital of Japan
- Nara: a core city, the capital of Nara Prefecture
- Osaka: a designated city, the capital of Osaka Prefecture
- Otsu: a core city, the capital of Shiga Prefecture
- Sakai: a designated city
- Tsu: the capital of Mie Prefecture
- Wakayama: a core city, the capital of Wakayama Prefecture

=== Other cities ===
- Amagasaki, Hyōgo: a core city
- Akashi, Hyōgo: a core city
- Higashiōsaka, Osaka: a core city
- Himeji, Hyōgo: a core city
- Hirakata, Osaka: a core city
- Ibaraki, Osaka: a special city
- Kakogawa, Hyōgo: a special city
- Kishiwada, Osaka: a special city
- Neyagawa, Osaka: a core city
- Nishinomiya, Hyōgo: a core city
- Suita, Osaka: a special city
- Takarazuka, Hyōgo: a special city
- Takatsuki, Osaka: a core city
- Toyonaka, Osaka: a core city
- Yao, Osaka: a core city
- Yokkaichi, Mie: a special city

== Education ==
=== International schools ===
International schools have served expatriates in the Kansai region since 1909. Outside of Tokyo and Yokohama, Kansai has the largest number of international schools.

In 1909, Deutsche Schule Kobe was founded to serve German, Austrian and German-speaking Swiss expatriates, traders and missionaries living in the Kobe area. After a long history of teaching a German curriculum, the school changed to The Primary Years Programme (PYP) in 2002. It provides curriculum in three languages: German, English, and Japanese.

In 1913, Canadian Methodist Academy opened its doors to sixteen children. The school, renamed Canadian Academy in 1917, served children of missionary parents from grade one through high school and offered boarding facilities for students from throughout Asia. Today, the day and boarding school offers a PreK to Grade 12 education on the campus on Rokkō Island, a human-made island. The school, which is no longer affiliated with Canada or the church, is the largest school for expatriates in Kansai. The school is approved by the Japanese Ministry of Education and accredited by the Western Association of Schools and Colleges (WASC) and the Council of International Schools. The school awards both the International Baccalaureate (IB) and U.S. high school diplomas.

The number of international schools burgeoned after World War II.

In 1946, St. Michael's International School was established by Anglican Bishop Michael Yashiro and Miss Leonora Lee, a British missionary. Today, the school offers a distinctive British-style primary education based on the National Curriculum of England and Wales. The school has joint accreditation from the Council of International Schools and the Western Association of Schools and Colleges.

Brother Charles Fojoucyk and Brother Stephen Weber founded Marist Brothers International School in 1951 after communist authorities pressured them to leave Tientsin, China. Today, the international Montessori - Grade 12 school enrolls approximately 300 students. The school is accredited by the Western Association of Schools and Colleges.

In 1957, a missionary homeschooled her son, his best friend and another student in their home. The next year, the home turned into Kyoto Christian Day School and a full-time teacher was hired. The school was renamed Kyoto International School in 1966. Today, the school serves students from two to fourteen years old. The school has been accredited by the Western Association of Schools and Colleges (WASC) since 1992 and authorized by the International Baccalaureate Organisation (IBO) since 2006.

In 2024, Temple University Japan opened a Kyoto satellite campus, where students can receive an American university education and degree. Classes are taught fully in English. The Kyoto campus offers general education courses in Kyoto, where students then typically transfer to the Tokyo or U.S. campus.

Kansai is also served by Osaka International School, Lycée français international de Kyoto as well as Chinese and Korean schools.

== Air transportation ==
The region is served by these airports:

- Kansai International Airport
- Itami Airport
- Kobe Airport
- Nanki–Shirahama Airport

== Gallery ==
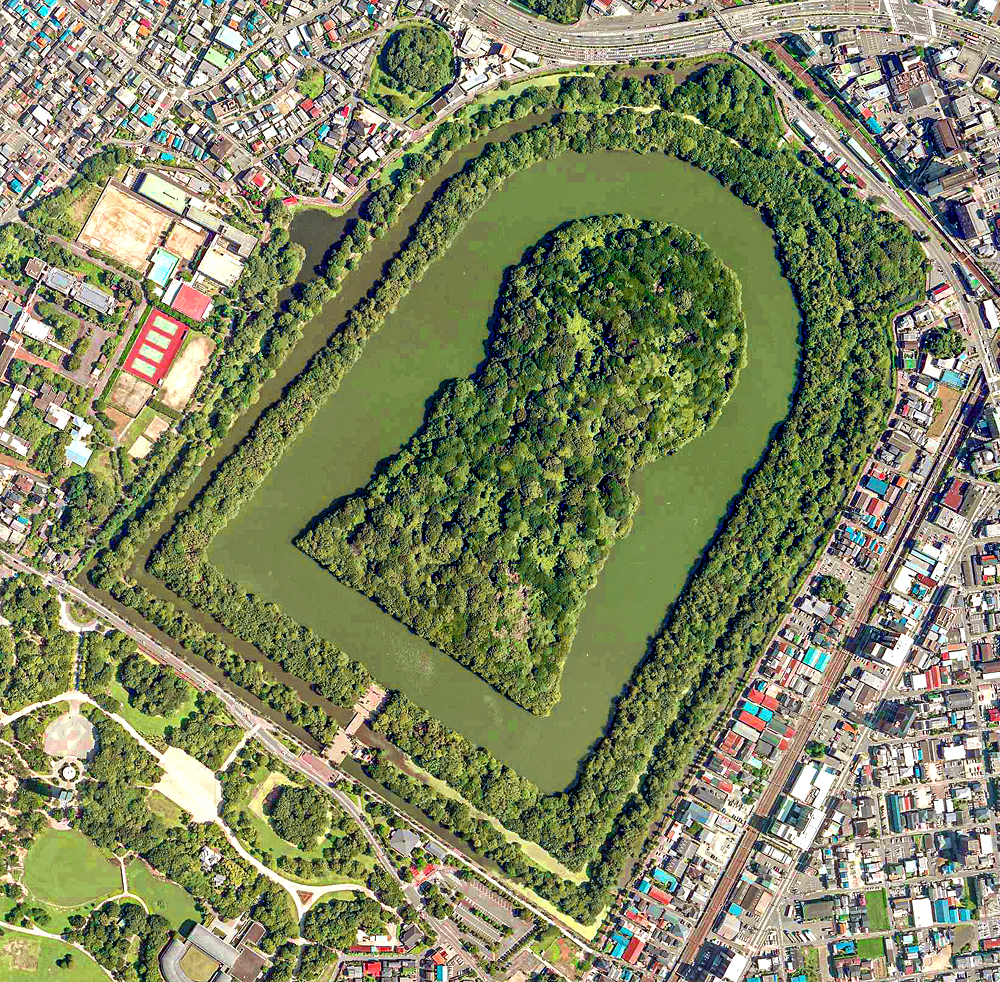
Daisen Kofun, the largest burial mound in the world

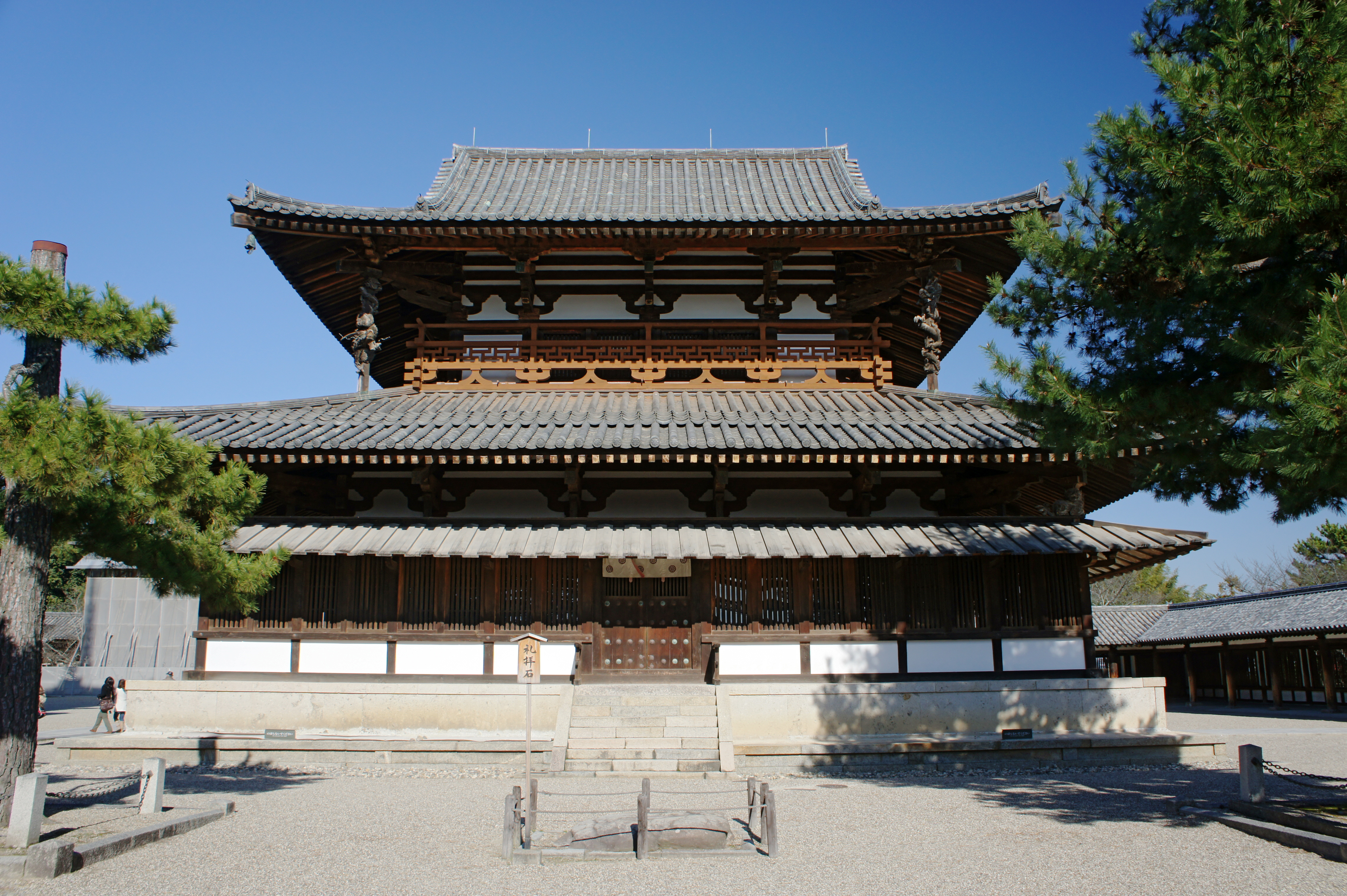
Hōryū-ji Golden Hall, the oldest wooden structure in the world

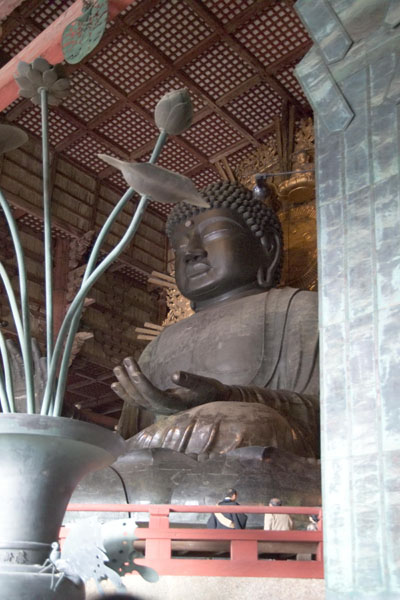
Daibutsu at Tōdai-ji, the largest bronze statue in the world

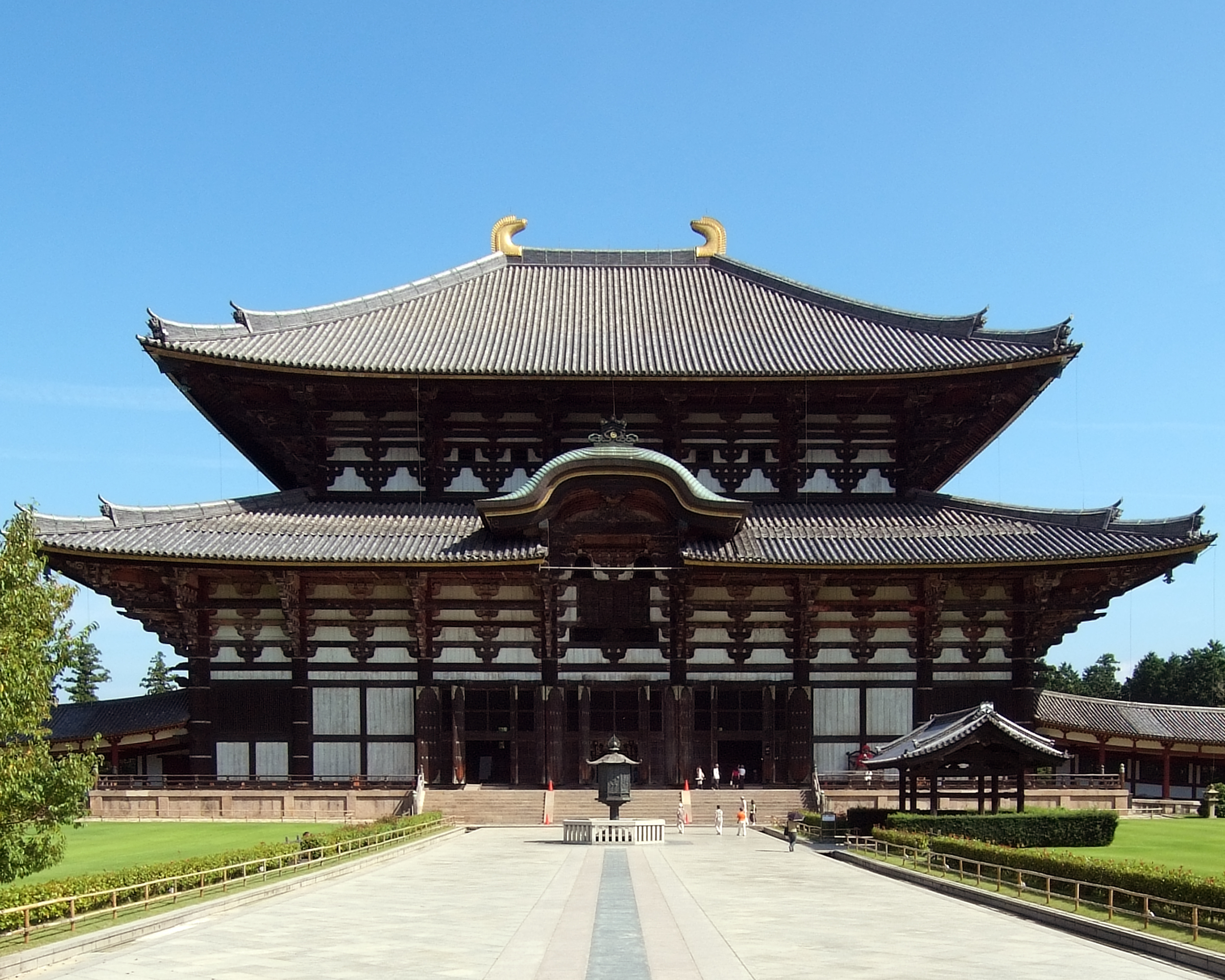
Tōdai-ji Main Hall, until 1998 the largest wooden structure in the world

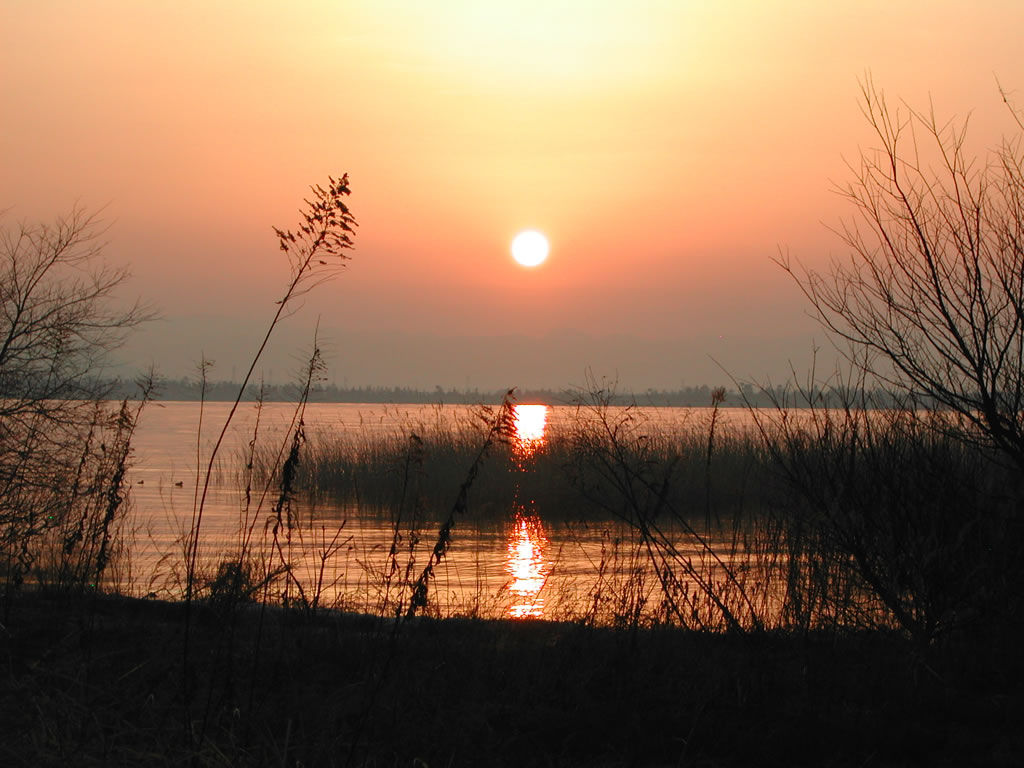
Lake Biwa, the largest lake in Japan and one of the oldest lakes in the world

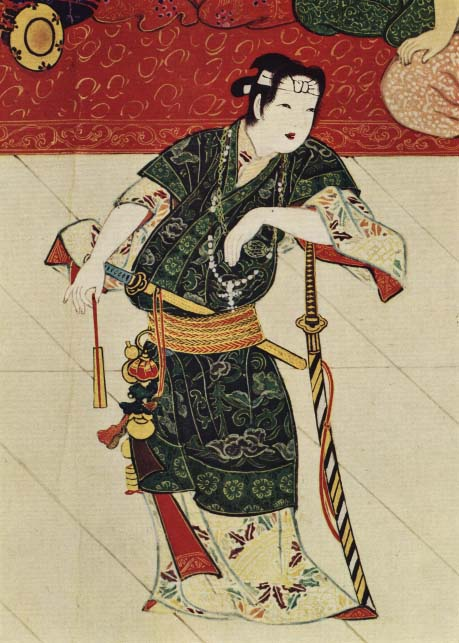
Izumo no Okuni, who founded Kabuki in Kyoto

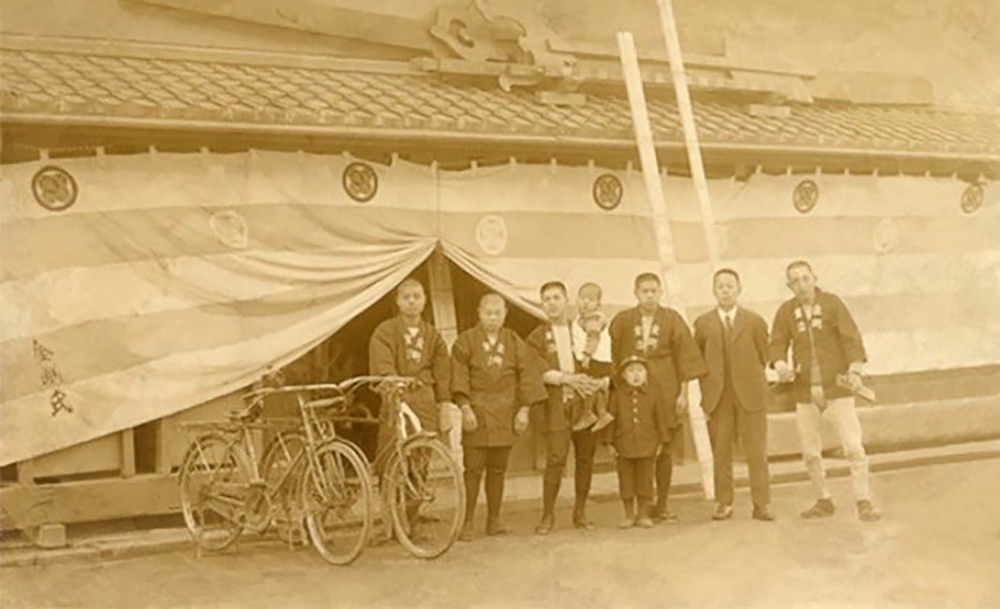
Kongō Gumi, once the world's oldest continuously operating company, constructed several of Japan's cultural assets.

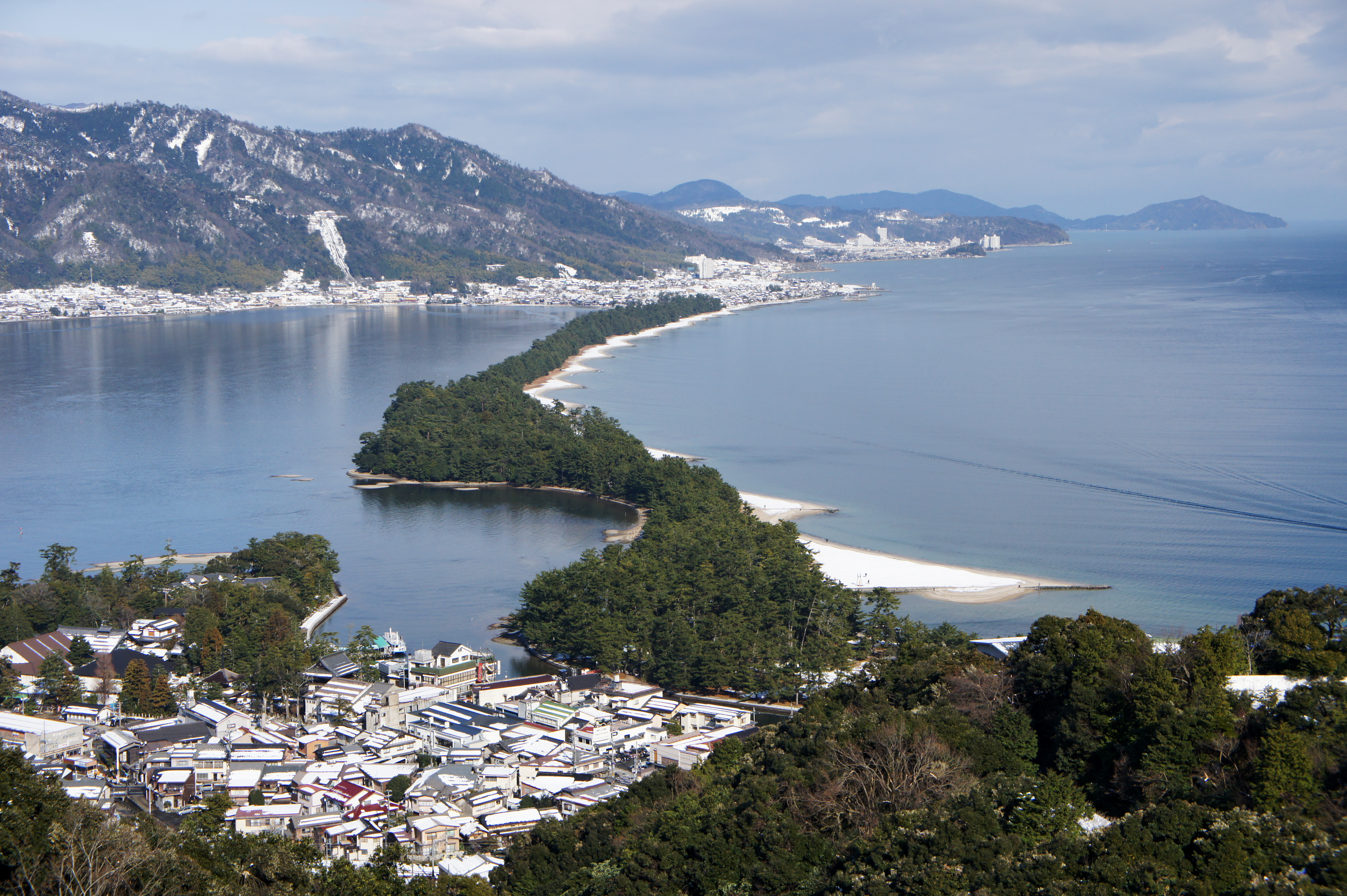
Amanohashidate, one of Three Views of Japan

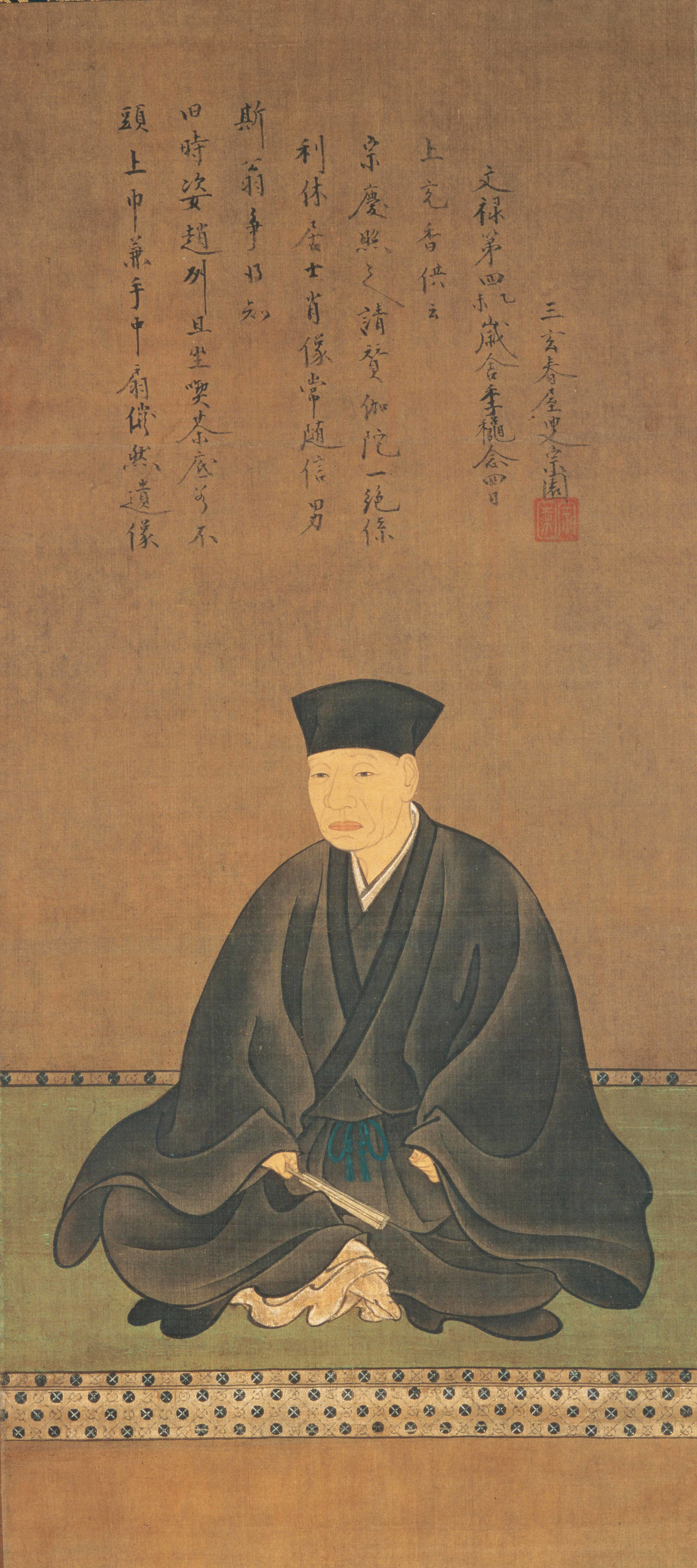
Sen no Rikyū, a merchant from Sakai, perfected the courtesy of the tea ceremony.

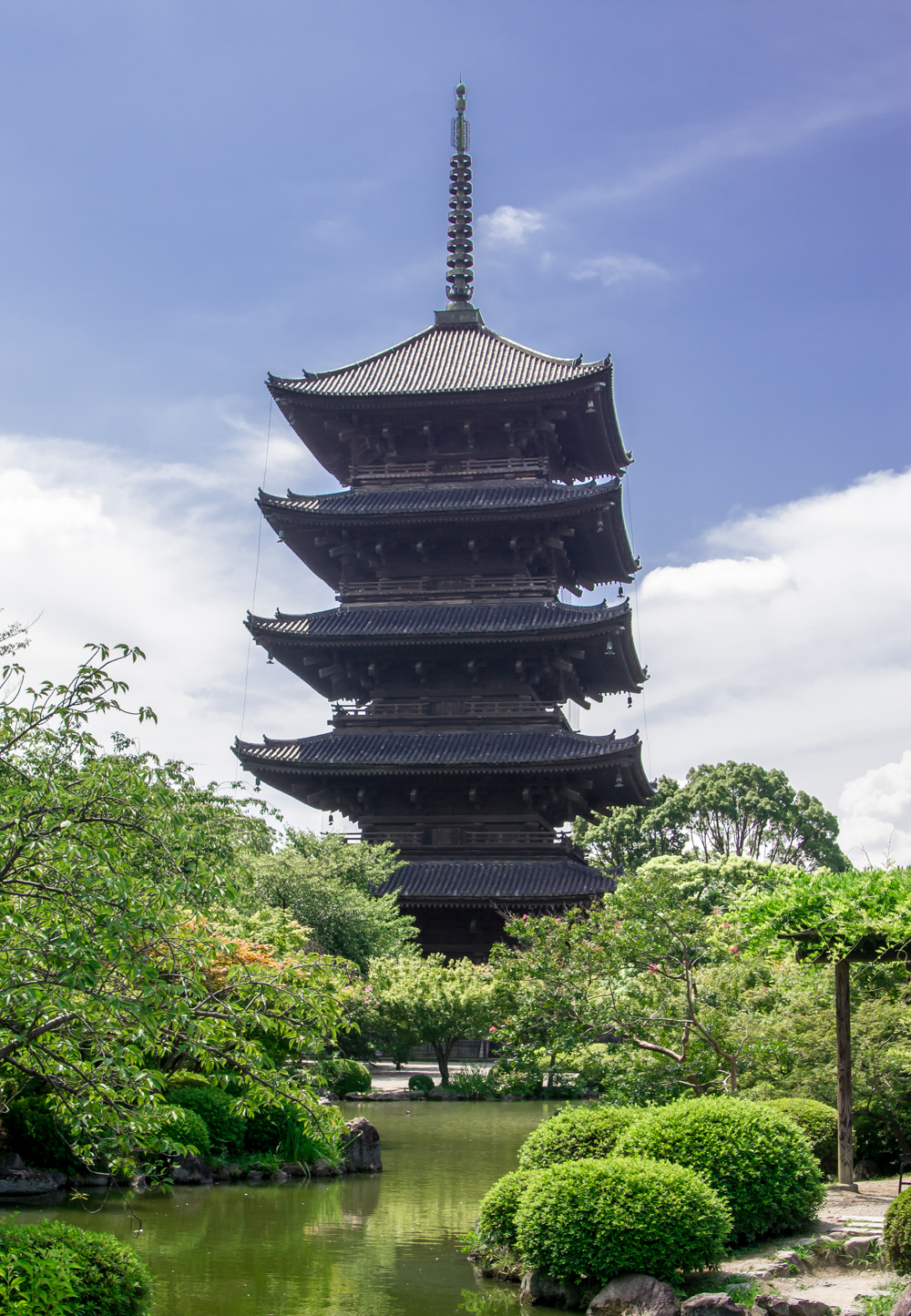
Japan's tallest temple pagoda in Tō-ji, Kyoto

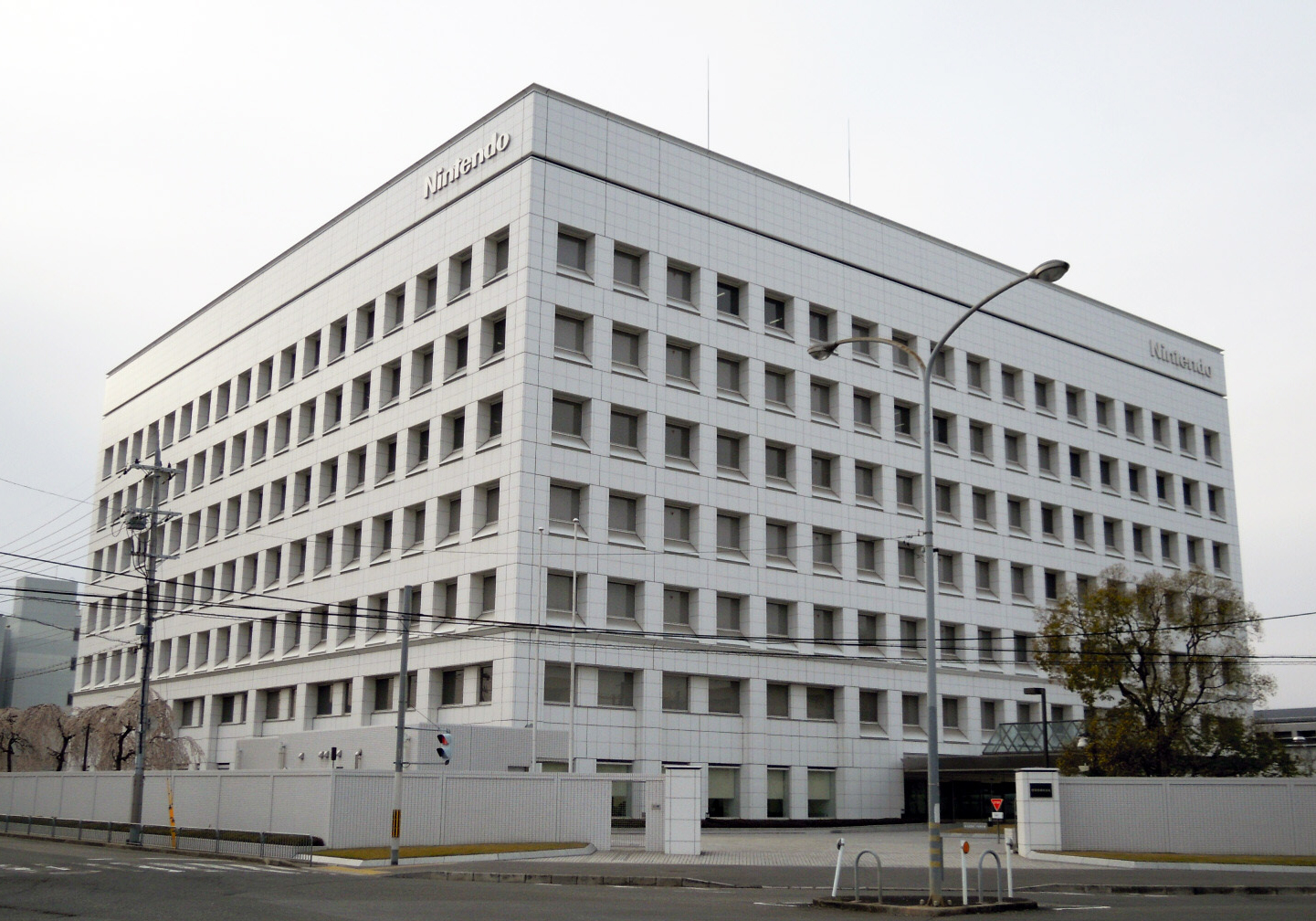
Nintendo became the world's most successful video game company.

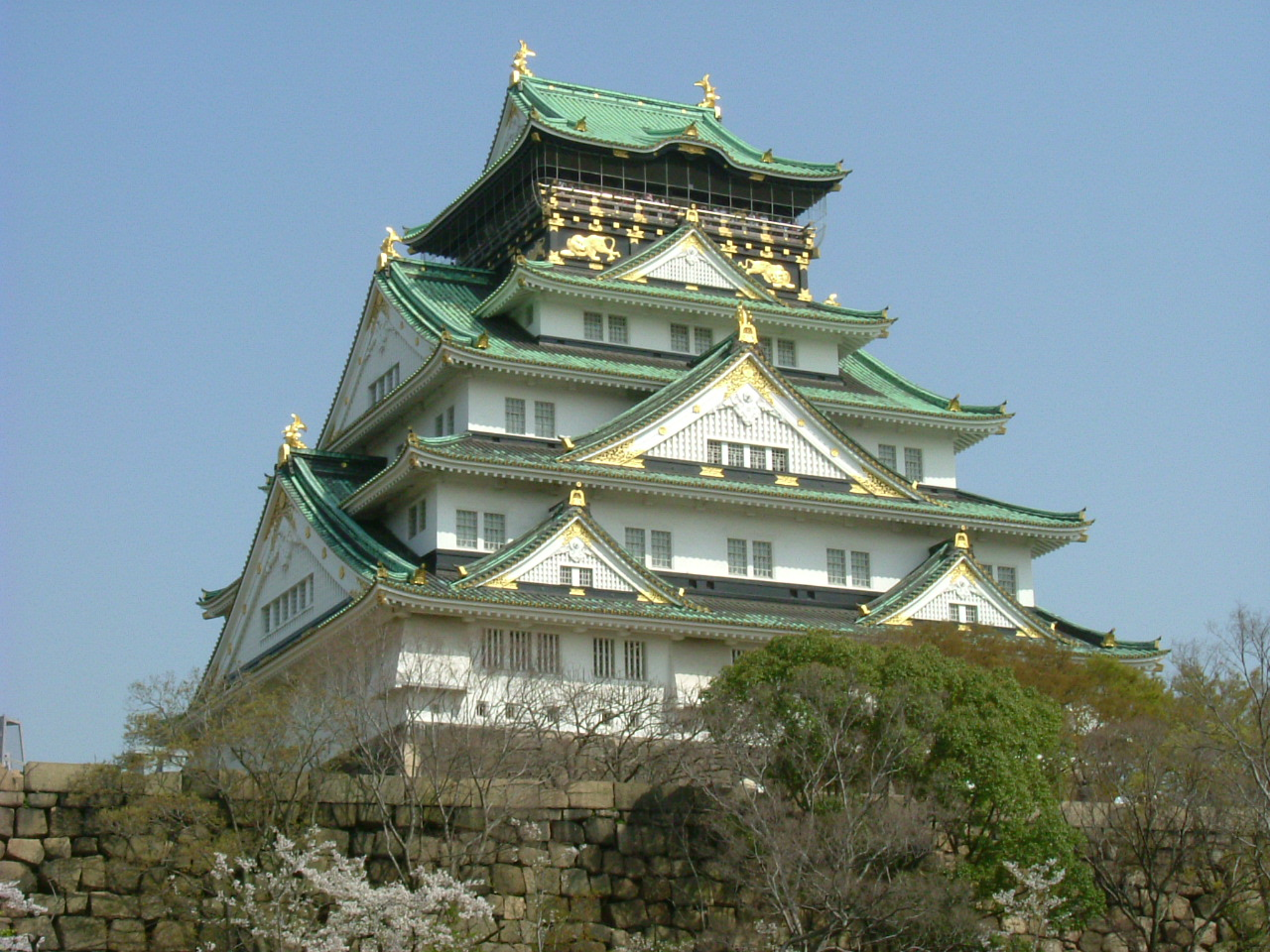
Osaka Castle

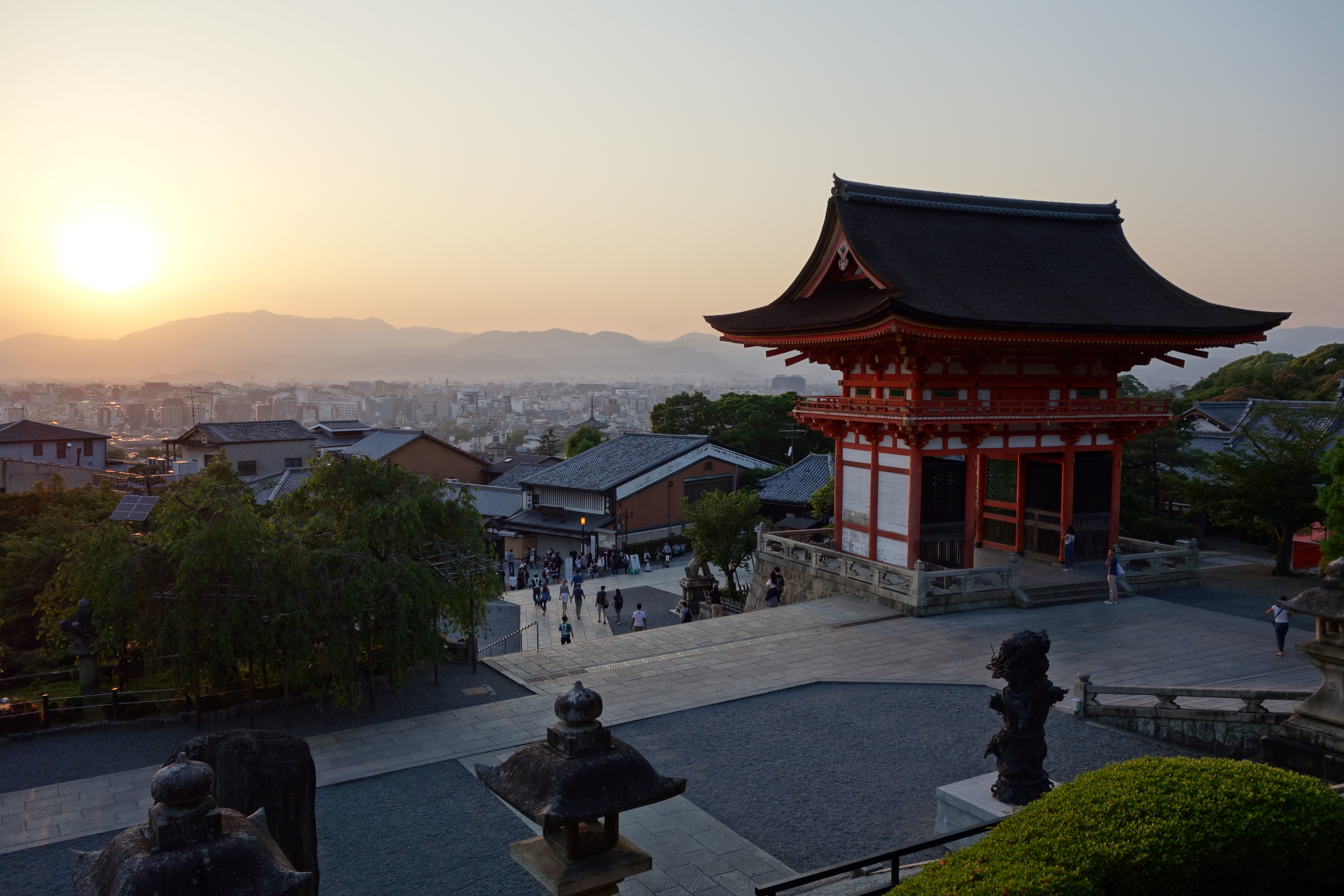
Kyoto from Kiyomizudera

== See also ==
- Geography of Japan
- Kansai Science City
- List of cities in Japan by population
- List of regions in Japan
- Ōban (Great Watch)
- Osaka World Expo 2025 pavilions
- Pokémon Gold and Silver, which are set in the fictional Johto region, based on Kansai.
- Transport in Keihanshin

== Bibliography ==
- Nussbaum, Louis-Frédéric and Käthe Roth. (2005). Japan encyclopedia. Cambridge: Harvard University Press. ISBN 978-0-674-01753-5; OCLC 58053128
