= Seeb (disambiguation) =

Seeb is a city in Oman.

Seeb or SEEB may also refer to:

- Al-Seeb Club, an Omani football club
  - Al-Seeb Stadium, a sports stadium
- Seeb (music producers), a Norwegian EDM production duo
- Seeb International Airport, former name of Muscat International Airport
- Al Baraka Palace, a royal palace also called Seeb Palace

== See also ==
- SIB (disambiguation)
