= Special Investigations Section =

Special Investigations Section or Special Investigation Section may refer to:

- LAPD Special Investigation Section, a tactical detective and stakeout unit of the Los Angeles Police Department
- Special Investigation Section, a Special Investigation Team of the Kanagawa Prefectural Police
- Special Investigation Team (India)
- Special Investigation Section, a unit in the Criminal Investigation Department of the Singapore Police Force
- Assorted criminal investigation units of the following police forces:
  - Atlantic City Police Department
  - Baltimore Police Department
  - Halifax Regional Police
  - Indianapolis Metropolitan Police Department
  - Las Vegas Metropolitan Police Department
  - Miami Police Department
  - Miami Gardens Police Department
  - Rochester Police Department
  - Sarasota County Sheriff's Office
  - Tucson Police Department
  - Vancouver Police Department
  - Metro Vancouver Transit Police
- State bureau of investigation units of the following American state police forces and state agencies:
  - Arizona Attorney General
  - Delaware State Police
  - Indiana State Police
  - Kentucky State Police
  - Michigan State Police
  - New Jersey State Police
  - Tennessee Department of Revenue
  - Washington State Patrol

== See also ==
- SIS (disambiguation)
- Special Investigations Unit (disambiguation)
- Special Investigations Bureau (disambiguation)
- Special Investigations Division (disambiguation)
- Office of Special Investigations (disambiguation)
- Special Investigations (disambiguation)
