= Special Investigations =

Special Investigation or Special Investigations may refer to:

- Department of Special Investigation, a Thai security service
- Special Investigation Branch, the British armed forces military police CID
- Special Investigations Department (Brazil), a part of the Civil Police
- Special Investigation Group, a New Zealand governmental security group
- Special Investigation Team (India)

== See also ==
- Special Criminal Investigation, a 1989 arcade game
- Special Investigations Unit (disambiguation)
- Special Investigations Bureau (disambiguation)
- Special Investigations Division (disambiguation)
- Office of Special Investigations (disambiguation)
- Special Investigations Section (disambiguation)
