= Special Investigations Division =

Special Investigations Division or Special Investigation Division may refer to:

- Prince George's County Police Department's Special Investigation Division, of the Prince George's County Police Department
- Special Investigation Division (Taiwan), a former entity in Taiwan; see September 2013 power struggle
- Special Investigation Team (India)

== See also ==
- SID (disambiguation)
- Special Investigations Unit (disambiguation)
- Special Investigations Bureau (disambiguation)
- Office of Special Investigations (disambiguation)
- Special Investigations Section (disambiguation)
- Special Investigations (disambiguation)
