= Special Investigations Bureau =

Special Investigations Bureau or Special Investigation Bureau may refer to:

- Bureau of Special Investigation of Myanmar
- Puerto Rico Special Investigations Bureau
- Wichita Police Department's Special Investigations Bureau
- Special Investigation Team (India)

== See also ==
- SIB (disambiguation)
- Special Investigations Unit (disambiguation)
- Special Investigations Division (disambiguation)
- Office of Special Investigations (disambiguation)
- Special Investigations Section (disambiguation)
- Special Investigations (disambiguation)
