= New Jersey Superior Court, Appellate Division =

Appellate court in New Jersey, US

The New Jersey Superior Court, Appellate Division (in case citation, N.J. Super. Ct. App. Div) is the intermediate appellate court in New Jersey. "The Appellate Division of New Jersey's Superior Court is the first level appellate court, with appellate review authority over final judgments of the trial divisions and the Tax Court and over final decisions and actions of State administrative agencies." Above the New Jersey Superior Court, Appellate Division is the Supreme Court of New Jersey which "sits alone atop the State judiciary, entertaining appeals from the Appellate Division and, on rare occasions, directly by order of the Court from other cases within the judicial and administrative system."

The Appellate Division hears appeals from the Law and Chancery Divisions of the New Jersey Superior Court, the Tax Court, and final decisions of State administrative agencies. The Appellate Division decides approximately 7,000 appeals and 7,500 motions each year. "Generally speaking, an appellate court's judgment provides 'the final directive of the appeals courts as to the matter appealed, setting out with specificity the court's determination that the action appealed from should be affirmed, reversed, remanded or modified'".

== Organization ==
The Appellate Division is divided into eight "parts" (designated "A" through "H") of four or five judges each. Judges are rotated among the parts on an annual basis. Unlike the federal and some other state appellate courts, appeals are not allocated among the parts on a territorial basis and Appellate Division precedent is equally binding statewide.

The Appellate Division consists of 35 judges in total. One of the judges on each part is designated as the presiding judge and there is an overall presiding judge for administration. Appeals are decided by a panel of three judges from the part to which the appeal is assigned. If the New Jersey Supreme Court has fewer than five members available to hear a case, either because of vacancies or recusals, senior Appellate Division judges may be assigned to serve temporarily.

The Appellate Division has a central clerk's office that processes the filing of notices of appeal, briefs, motions and other papers. The chambers of the Appellate Division judges are located in Atlantic City, Hackensack, Jersey City, Morristown, New Brunswick, Newark, Trenton, West Long Branch, and Westmont. Oral argument is held at a variety of courthouses across the state, but only Trenton, Morristown, and Hackensack have purpose-built dedicated courtrooms for the Appellate Division. Oral argument has also been held at mock courtrooms at the Newark and Camden campuses of Rutgers Law School.

== How to file an appeal ==
An appeal as of right in New Jersey must be filed within 45 days. The appellant is required to file a Notice of Appeal with a Transcript Request Form having been filled out, an appellate Case Information Statement, and pay the required filing fees and deposit for costs.

== How to file an interlocutory appeal ==
An interlocutory appeal is a highly unusual type of appeal which can be filed before a case is concluded in the trial divisions of the Superior Court (Law or Chancery Divisions or the Family, General Equity, Probate or Foreclosure Parts). Usually, litigants can only appeal a Final Order of a Court in which one or more parties have "lost" and wish to have 3 (usually more experienced) judges rule on their case. Usually, interlocutory appeals are only accepted if the issue being appealed is dispositive of the entire case. A common example would be a criminal case in which the trial judge has ruled certain evidence, usually drugs, is admissible against the defendant. If the evidence is ruled to be inadmissible, the entire case would be usually be dismissed under the Exclusionary Rule. Therefore, it is efficient to have the issue decided by the appeals court before a trial, after which there may be a successful appeal to have the entire case dismissed—wasting much time and money in the process. (If the prosecutor loses an exclusionary case, that would almost always be a Final Order and the prosecutor would have 45 days to appeal—the same as any other litigant.)

Interlocutory appeals are highly disfavored, as a result, in New Jersey, they must be filed within 20 days of the order being questioned—not the usual 45 day period. Also, the chance of being granted an interlocutory appeal is on the order of 10% -- but maybe 30% in an exclusionary case, as discussed above and, perhaps, 50% in a case of "great public importance." Such "important" cases are very strictly defined as ones in which hundreds, if not thousands, of litigants' cases will be decided on one undefined legal issue (very rarely two or more). Two examples would be the issue of the admissibility of new "breathalyzer" test (called the "Alcotest") or various insurance questions relevant to Hurricane Sandy. The "importance" of these cases was, respectively, that hundreds of drunk driving cases would have been dismissed if the Alcotest were inadmissible and that dozens of insurance companies and tens of thousands of insureds needed answers to various coverage and other "technical" insurance issues. When these "important" issues were decided, no matter for which party, 80% to 95% of the cases would settle based on the resolution of the issues, which is highly efficient for all concerned.

Please also note that, while most motions in the Appellate Division have no filing fee and "normal" appeals may be initiated by filing a 5 to 6 page "fill in the blanks" Notice of Appeal and Case Information Statement within 45 days, the moving party is required to file a Notice of Motion for Leave to File an Interlocutory Appeal with a brief and appendix, and pay the required filing fee which is $250 as of this writing.

== How to file an emergent appeal, an emergency appeal, or for interim relief ==
An emergent appeal in New Jersey must be filed as soon as possible upon the emergency issue arising. One must first determine which judge is assigned to emergent duty for the vicinage. A moving party must then complete and return an emergent intake sheet. If one is granted permission to pursue emergent relief, either a Notice of Motion for Leave to File an Interlocutory Appeal is filed or a Notice of Appeal, depending upon the relief sought and the procedural posture of the case. The moving party then follows the directive of the court or the procedures for either an appeal as of right an interlocutory appeal.

The necessary form to apply for permission to file an emergent motion is available online.

== Pre-appeal procedure ==
The Court has two programs which are designed to dispose of appeals without the need for a full appellate hearing.

=== Civil Appeals Settlement Program ===
For appeals of civil cases, the Civil Appeals Settlement Program is designed to identify appeals which could possibly be settled, at the initial phase of processing. Alternatively, appeals with very complex issues may be selected for a pre-argument conference, in order to delineate and clarify those issues prior to briefing.

=== Sentencing calendars ===
For appeals of criminal cases, Sentencing Calendars were initially designed to dispose of those appeals in which the sole issue on appeal was the excessiveness of the sentence imposed. The program has been expanded to include additional sentencing issues. Because of the narrow issues being addressed, appeals considered in this program are argued without the need for full briefing.
