= Special Investigations Unit =

Special Investigations Unit or Special Investigation Unit may refer to:

- Special Investigations Unit (Ontario), a provincial police oversight agency in Canada
- CNN Special Investigations Unit, an investigative documentary on CNN
- Multnomah County Sheriff's Office's Special Investigations Unit
- New York State Office of Tax Enforcement's Special Investigations Unit
- S.I.U. (film), 2011 Korean action film
- White House Plumbers, covert White House Special Investigations Unit during the Nixon presidency
- Special Investigation Team (India)

== See also ==
- Special Investigating Unit, South African law enforcement agency
- SIU (disambiguation)
- Special Investigations Bureau (disambiguation)
- Special Investigations Division (disambiguation)
- Office of Special Investigations (disambiguation)
- Special Investigations Section (disambiguation)
- Special Investigations (disambiguation)
