= Nagoya International School =

Private non-sectarian day school in Japan

- 名古屋国際学園

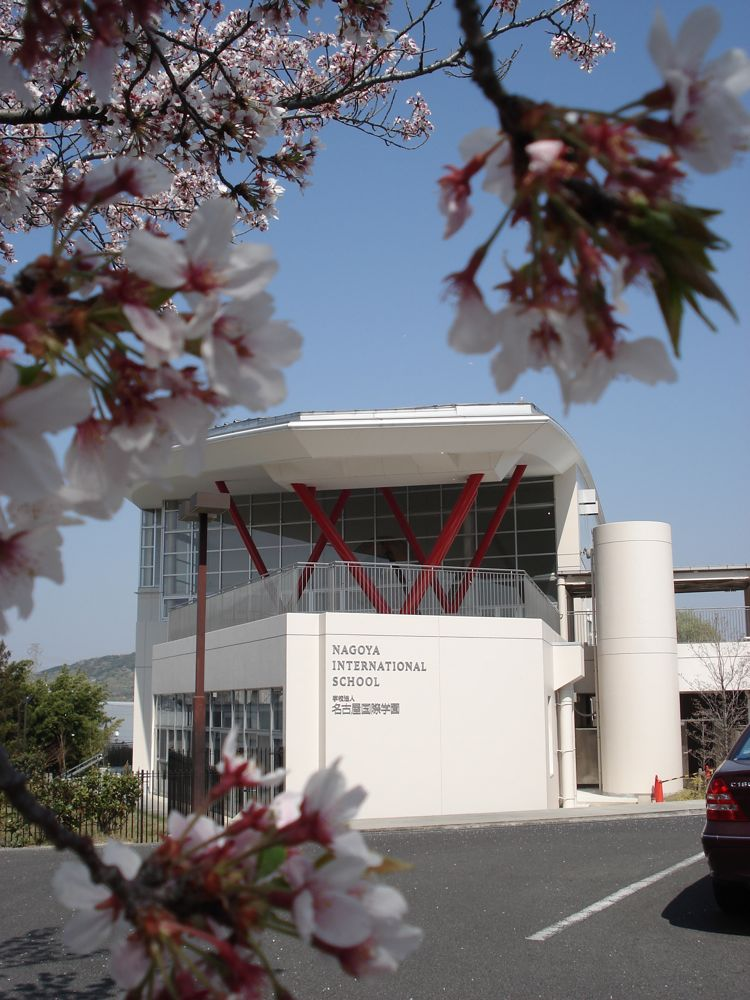

Location
- 2686 Minamihara Nakashidami, Moriyama-ku, Nagoya, Japan 463-0002; 35°14′35″N 137°01′58″E

Information
- Type: Private school
- Established: 1964
- Website: https://www.nisjapan.net/

Nagoya International School (NIS) is a private non-sectarian day international school in Nagoya, Aichi, Japan. Instruction is in English. The co-educational school serves students in preschool through high school. Graduates earn a standard NIS diploma or an International Baccalaureate diploma. Nagoya International School was opened in 1964 partly in response to the demand for English-language instruction post World War II. The curriculum of Nagoya International School was initially based on the curriculum of American schools, but, over the years, the curriculum has been redesigned to be more international. The school is open to students of all backgrounds who can demonstrate the ability to succeed in an English-language school.

Nagoya International School enrolled 496 students at the start of the 2017/2018 academic year at which time it had 54 full-time faculty members.

== History ==
A school run by the American corporation Lockheed closed in 1963, precipitating a demand for a new international school that offered instruction in English for children of foreigners living in Japan. At that time, the only option for English-language instruction in the Nagoya area was the small and already crowded Apostolic Christian Academy, a Canadian school. David Smith, then the director of the Nagoya American Cultural Center, promoted the school and raised money for its launch from private and government sources. The United States State Department lent its support as did various businesses. The Aichi prefectural government was also an important early supporter.

The school held its first classes for 84 students on September 8, 1964 in an abandoned building on loan from Nanzan Jr. High school. The student body represented seven different nations. Enrollment increased to 104 the following year. The school leaders negotiated the purchase of land belonging to sixteen rice farmers in Moriyama-ku. Then Antonin Raymond, who studied under Frank Lloyd Wright, was hired to design a dedicated school building. Construction kicked off in 1967. In 1968, the school held its first graduation.

Enrollment climbed to 313 students in the 1970s but declined steeply in the 1980s. Headmaster Don Bergman believed the school would not survive using its current model of enrolling only foreign students, and Nagoya International School opened its doors to Japanese students. Enrollment increased, stabilizing at 400. Following the Great Hanshin earthquake, the school's gym was deemed unsafe, and a new gym and classroom building was built. The new Wing Building was opened in 1999.

Charles Barton served as NIS headmaster from 1993-2007. During Barton's tenure, the school grew and new facilities were added. The Charles Barton Memorial Garden is named in his memory. The current Head of School, Matthew Parr, also serves as the President of the Japan Council of International Schools. In 2020, the brand new east building was finished to provide a better learning environment for the growing number of students. In 2022, the field was rebuilt because of its deteriorating artificial grass.

== Curriculum ==
Nagoya International School offers four programs: preschool and kindergarten; elementary school, middle school, and high school. The curriculum is built around five essential elements of learning: knowledge, concepts, skills, attitudes and action. The preschool and kindergarten serves students ages 3–5, and curriculum is based on the Reggio Emilia approach. The elementary school serves students ages 6–10. The middle school serves students 11 through 14 and the high school serves students ages 15 through 18.

== Student life ==
Nagoya International School's team mascot is the dolphin. The school has boys' volleyball, basketball, baseball, and soccer; girls' volleyball, basketball, soccer, and softball as well as co-educational tennis and badminton teams.

The school offers numerous classes in theater, art, and music. In 2014, the school implemented a student council to allow students a voice in school management.

== Community service ==
Nagoya International School is substantially involved in the Nagoya community. The school sponsors the annual Nagoya Walkathon. Students participate in a number of charitable endeavors include tutoring and building houses for people in the Philippines, Cambodia, Thailand, and Malaysia. Students have twice assisted relief efforts in Tohoku. NIS also hosts a chapter of the Red Cross. The NIS Junior Red Cross teaches students to administer first aid and CPR and also to communicate in American Sign language.

== Facilities ==
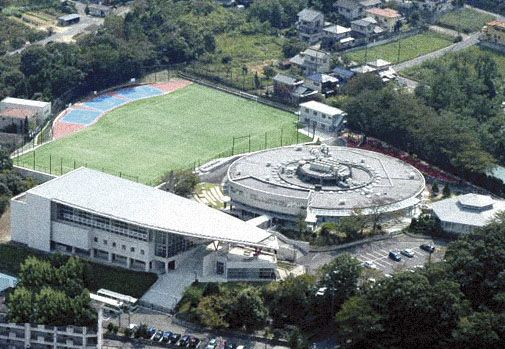
Aerial image of the campus

NIS facilities consist of five instructional buildings, a sports field, field house, playgrounds, and eight acres of open, park-like space. The school has a gym and a culture center as well as classrooms. As of 2017, a further expansion of the school is being considered. In 2020 the east building was finished. In 2022 the field was remade because of its age and deterioration.

== Finances ==
As of 2016, 95 percent of Nagoya International School's funding comes from tuition and fees. The remainder is gifts and income from endowments.
