= Canadian International School =

Canadian International School may refer to:

- Canadian International School (Bangalore)
- Canadian International School of Beijing
- Canadian International School of Guangzhou
- Canadian International School of Vietnam
- Canadian International School of Hong Kong
- Canadian International School (Pakistan)
- Canadian International School of Phnom Penh
- Canadian International School (Singapore)
- Canadian International School (Tokyo)
