= Osaka International School =

Coordinates: 34.830174°N 135.508461°E

Location
- 4-4-16 Onohara-nishi, Minoh, Osaka 〒562-0032; Minoh, Osaka; Japan

Information
- Type: Private/co-educational
- Motto: Informed, caring, and creative individuals contributing to a global community The Five Respects: Respect for self, others, environment, leadership and authority, learning
- Established: 1991
- Principal: Stephanie Alcantara, Stephen Frater
- Head of school: Kurt Mecklem
- Enrollment: Approx. 489
- Colors: Purple, Black, White, and Yellow
- Mascot: Crossed Sabers
- Website: https://sois.kwansei.ac.jp/

Osaka International School of Kwansei Gakuin (OIS, 関西学院大阪インターナショナルスクール) is a co-educational international school, located in Minoh, Osaka Prefecture, Japan. This institution educates students from kindergarten (age 4-5) through to grade 12. It is accredited by the Western Association of Schools and Colleges and offers three International Baccalaureate (IB) programs: Primary Years Programme (PYP), Middle Years Programme (MYP), and Diploma Programme (DP).

The government of Osaka Prefecture classifies the school as a "miscellaneous school".

OIS shares its campus, facilities, and a number of programs with its sister school, Senri International School (SIS), a grade 7-12 Japanese curriculum school primarily for students who have lived abroad. Together, the schools are known as the "Senri and Osaka International Schools of Kwansei Gakuin". Secondary school students from both schools share classes in physical education, music, and art. Senior students in English and Japanese can take courses in either one of the schools. Students from both schools also join together for athletic teams, drama casts, choirs, bands, and orchestra groups.

Founded in 1991, This institution is a member of the Japan Council of International Schools (JCIS), the Council of International Schools (CIS) and the East Asia Regional Council of Schools (EARCOS).

== Student body ==
As of 2016, about 33% of the school's population of Senri and Osaka International School body is made up of returnees. It is the third-largest English/European language international school in Japan and the largest school of such a field of study in the Kansai region.
