= Cis =

Cis or cis- may refer to:

== Places ==
- Cis, Trentino, in Italy
- In Poland:
  - Cis, Pomeranian Voivodeship
  - Cis, Świętokrzyskie Voivodeship
  - Cis, Warmian-Masurian Voivodeship

== Math, science and biology ==
- cis (mathematics) (cis(θ)), a trigonometric mathematical function related to Euler's formula
- Cis (beetle), genus
- cis–trans isomerism, in chemistry
- cis-regulatory element, regions of non-coding DNA which regulate the transcription of nearby genes

== Other uses ==
- Cisgender, a descriptor for somebody whose gender identity matches their assigned gender at birth
- C♯ (musical note), known as cis in some European notations

== See also ==
- CIS (disambiguation)
- Ciss (disambiguation)
- Csi (disambiguation)
