= SIU =

SIU or Siu may mean:

== People ==
- Shao, a Chinese surname, sometimes transliterated as Siu
- Xiao (surname), a Chinese surname, sometimes transliterated as Siu
- Siu, a god-hero of Torres Strait Islander people
- Slave In Utero, the pen name of Lee Jong-hui, author of the South Korean webcomic Tower of God

== Organizations ==
- Scotland in Union, a Scottish Unionist advocacy group
- Seafarers International Union of North America, an organization of labor unions
- Shinawatra University, in Bangkok, Thailand
- Special Investigating Unit, South African law enforcement agency
- Symbiosis International University, a private deemed university in India
- Southern Illinois University, a university system in the United States
  - Southern Illinois University Carbondale, the system's flagship university

== Media ==
- S.I.U. (film), a 2011 South Korean action film
- SIU, a 2019 Vocaloid album

== Transport ==
- Siuna Airport in Nicaragua (IATA Code)
- Segment of Independent Utility, a highway engineering term for divisions of large-scale construction projects; see Interstate 69 § Route description

== Other uses ==
- "Siu", a goal celebration by Cristiano Ronaldo

== See also ==
- Special Investigations Unit
