= Office of Special Investigations =

Office of Special Investigations may refer to:

- U.S. Air Force Office of Special Investigations
- Office of Special Investigations (Government Accountability Office)
- Office of Special Investigations (United States Department of Justice)

== See also ==
- OSI (disambiguation)
- Special Investigations Unit (disambiguation)
- Special Investigations Bureau (disambiguation)
- Special Investigations Division (disambiguation)
- Special Investigations Section (disambiguation)
- Special Investigations (disambiguation)
