= Ciss =

Ciss (pronounced SIHS) is a Senegalese surname. Notable people with the surname include:

- Amadou Ciss (born 1999), Senegalese footballer who plays for Fortuna Sittard
- Elhadji Ciss (born 1994), Senegalese footballer who plays for Sion
- Khadija Ciss (born 1983), Senegalese swimmer
- Saliou Ciss (born 1989), Senegalese football player who plays for Valenciennes
