= CISS =

Ciss is a surname (see also for a list of people with the name).

CISS may refer to:

- CISS-FM, Canadian radio station
- Inter-American Centre for Social Security Studies a Social Security related international organisation in Latin America and the Caribbean
- Continuous Ink Supply System
- Center for Intelligence and Security Studies, a center at the University of Mississippi
- Concordia International School Shanghai, a coeducational day school Preschool to Grade 12 in Shanghai
- Computed Images System & Services division, a 1960s division of General Electric, now called "Genigraphics"
- Comité International des Sports des Sourds, "The International Committee of Sports for the Deaf"
- Canadian International School System
- Chirality-induced spin selectivity, a phenomenon where the handedness of molecules influences the spin-polarization of emitted or transmitted electrons
