= New International School (Tokyo) =

New International School of Japan

Location
- 3-18-32 Minami-Ikebukuro; Toshima, Tokyo, 171-0022; Japan

Information
- Type: Private
- Motto: Help us help you help your children!
- Established: 2001; 25 years ago
- Head teacher: Tim Stearns
- Staff: 5
- Faculty: 32
- Grades: PreK age 3 ~ Gr.12
- Enrollment: 187
- Colors: Maroon and Khaki
- Mascot: Newbird
- Accreditation: Middle States Association of Colleges and Schools, Council of International Schools
- Website: www.newis.ed.jp

New International School (NewIS) was founded in Tokyo, Japan, in 2001 as a dual language, multiage by design (3 year age range of students in each class) international school, initially for students from age 3 to grade 9, following the mission of Steven Parr, the founding director/head of school, and under the sponsorship of Iwata Gakuen.

== Curriculum ==
The students learn all core subjects in both English and Japanese with two teachers of equal status per class, one for Japanese and one for English, who, using an integrated, thematic approach, teach, plan and write their reports together. Mandarin Chinese is offered as an elective from grades one to twelve.

Drawing on the configuration of the Curriculum for Excellence (Scotland), the curriculum cycle is designed to assure breadth, balance, continuity, progression, and cohesion in all of the curriculum areas, with a comprehensive range of learning skills and informed attitudes developed in every topic. The classes all have a three-year cycle of themes, with one major theme in each of three twelve-week terms in a school year. The program rotates term by term through the major areas of social science [1. People, past events and societies (History); 2. People, place and environment (Geography); and 3. People in society, economy and business (Sociology, Politics, Economics, Anthropology)], and every year addresses four areas in science [ 1.Materials and Planet Earth (Chemistry); 2. Forces, electricity & waves (Physics); 3. Biological systems (Biology); and 4 .Topical science (contemporary issues)], and three areas in mathematics [1. Number, money and measure (Algebra, Advanced Algebra); 2. Shape, position and movement (Geometry, Pre-calculus, Calculus), and 3. Information Handling (Data Analysis, Statistics)]. Technology is an explicit curricular area whose strands are integrated into each of the subject areas.

Both the English and Japanese elements of the school program use the same pedagogies and curriculum, which has led the school to develop a radically different approach to Japanese kanji when compared to those used in the Japanese school system or at other international schools. Kanji are learned from an early age in a logical order for reading and writing as recommended by Professor Yukio Yoshimoto of Rikkyo and other universities, along with the learning of common use kanji and developmentally appropriate kanji in each of the subject areas related to the themes. Because the Japanese language has a purely phonetic alphabet, it is relatively easy for young children to learn to decode the language.

The students learn to play the violin by ear through the Suzuki method, starting from age 6, and many of them go on to other instruments as well. The visual and performing arts are also built into the curriculum.

Dr. Sandra Stone has been a consultant to the multiage program, and Professor Emeritus Kazuko Nakajima of the University of Toronto has been a consultant to the Japanese program since the school was established.

=== Multiage ===
All classes follow a multiage style of education. Each of the classes has a three-year age-grade range of students and at least two teachers who use formative assessment methods and a developmental approach, as opposed to a standardized curriculum. The students continually create and recreate themselves as individuals without being compared to others and without the imposition of fixed age-grade expectations or limitations on their learning. Over the three year cycles, they experience different age and developmental perspectives and proficiences with respect to others as a matter of course. They learn from each other as well as from adults within their zones of proximal development (ZPD).

=== Dual language ===
The school's mission is: “every child becomes bilingual or multilingual over time.” To achieve this, the school uses a system of content-based dual language education, where all subjects are learned in both English and Japanese, and possibly in a third or fourth language as well for students who use yet other languages at home. The thematic approach facilitates the transfer of concepts from one language to another over time. Activities in context minimize the need for translation. In class, the students are welcome to use all of their languages in the process of learning and doing. Following the inspiration of Prof. Ofelia Garcia of CUNY graduate school, "translanguaging" methods are favored. The students develop and access their linguistic repertoire according to the context, which is how adults use language.

== Facilities ==
The school is housed in two complete buildings and part of four others in Minami-Ikebukuro, which is convenient to Ikebukuro station, Zoshigaya station, and other subway stations. There is a library and resource center, interactive smartboards, computers, an all-purpose room used for PE, assemblies, and events, and a rooftop playground. There is also a gym and an Early Learning Center.

== Extracurricular activities ==
To complement the multiage, hands on approach learning at the school, a number of student centered events have been created. These include, specialty weeks such as Book Week, Autumn Festival Week, Heritage Week, and Science and Technology Weeks; two or three day overnight camps for the older children; and whole school events such as Snow Day, Picnic and Field Day, a Spring Carnival, and yearly musical productions. The school also offers parents and visitors a number of orientations and seminars throughout the year focusing on different aspects of the program.

There is also a Saturday Program, Summer School Program, and After School Clubs or Extended Care.

== See also ==
- Active learning
- Assessment for learning
- Constructivism (learning theory)
