= Savings and Investment Bank =

Savings & Investment Bank (SIB) was a bank licensed in the Isle of Man that collapsed in 1982 with liabilities of some £37 million.

== History ==
Liquidation of the bank commenced on 29 July 1982. An approximate statement of affairs prepared for a creditors' meeting disclosed loans and advances over £40 million. In a statement to Tynwald Court the Chairman of the Finance Board said that after meeting the auditors and the directors of the Bank, it was obvious that SIB had made very large loans to a relatively small group of companies, beyond banking guidelines, and these were probably irrecoverable. Liquidation commenced 29 July 1982.

Claims from 3,000 depositors and other creditors totalling £31.4 million were admitted in the liquidation but recoveries from loans and advances totalled only £12.8 million. The eventual dividend was 29p in the pound which was finalised after 23 years. The Isle of Man Government made additional ex gratia payments of 50p in the pound to certain depositors on the first £10,000 of their deposits. Some depositors participated directly in the settlement of claims against SIB's auditors.

Following the collapse, the Lieutenant Governor commissioned an examination of banking supervision in the Isle of Man by officials seconded from the Bank of England. Responding to criticisms and recommendations contained in their report, the Financial Supervision Commission was established in 1983, and the Insurance Authority (later the Insurance and Pensions Authority) in 1986.

A further outcome of the SIB collapse was the introduction of a scheme to protect depositors with Isle of Man Banks, funded by a levy on participating operations - the Depositors' Compensation Scheme contained in the Banking Business (Compensation of Depositors) Regulations 1991.
