= Assignment cover sheet =

An assignment cover sheet is a paper used by students when completing assignments at university for their courses. These coversheets generally contain metadata about the assignment (such as the name of the student and the course number). This aids the efficient handling of assignments. Other types of data may be included, depending on the needs of the course.

Some universities require and/or provide cover sheets in standardized formats. These are often in the form of computer files which a student can download, print, and personalize.

Cover sheets are also required by some educational entities that are not universities.
