= Center for Internet and Society =

Center for Internet and Society may refer to:

- Berkman Center for Internet and Society, at Harvard University, US
- Stanford Center for Internet and Society, at Stanford Law School, US
- Centre for Internet and Society (India), in Bangalore, India
