= Elhadji Ciss =

Senegalese professional footballer

Personal information
- Full name: Abdoulaye Elhadji Ciss
- Date of birth: 26 June 1994 (age 32)
- Position: Defender

Team information
- Current team: FC Sion

Senior career*
| Years | Team | Apps | (Gls) |
| 2014– | FC Sion | 0 | (0) |
| 2015–2017 | → FC Le Mont (loan) | 16 | (0) |
| 2018 | → VPS (loan) | 13 | (2) |
- * Club domestic league appearances and goals as of 20 January 2019

Abdoulaye Elhadji Ciss (born 26 June 1994) is a Senegalese professional footballer who plays for Swiss club FC Sion, as a defender.
