= New Jersey Superior Court =

State court of New Jersey, US

Superior Court of New Jersey
- Established: 1947, in current form
- Composition method: Executive appointment with legislative confirmation
- Authorised by: New Jersey State Constitution
- Appeals to: New Jersey Superior Court, Appellate Division
- Judge term length: 7 years, then until 70 years of age
- Number of positions: ≈460
- Website: www.njcourts.gov

The Superior Court is the state court in the U.S. state of New Jersey, with statewide trial and appellate jurisdiction. The New Jersey Constitution of 1947 establishes the power of the New Jersey courts: under Article Six of the State Constitution, "judicial power shall be vested in a Supreme Court, a Superior Court, and other courts of limited jurisdiction." The Superior Court has three divisions: the Law Division which is the main trial court for cases of civil or criminal law, the Chancery Division, which tries equity law cases, and the Appellate Division, which is the intermediate appellate court in New Jersey. "Appeals may be taken to the Appellate Division of the Superior Court from the law and chancery divisions of the Superior Court and in such other causes as may be provided by law." Each division of the Superior Court is divided into various Parts."

The various Superior Courts in New Jersey are divided into 15 districts called "vicinages".

Judges of the Superior Court are appointed by the Governor and confirmed by the State Senate for initial terms of seven years. If reappointed before the expiration of the initial term, the judge is said to have tenure and can serve until the mandatory judicial retirement age of 70. After reaching mandatory retirement, state law allows judges to still serve on part-time recall.

== Law Division ==
The Law Division consists of the Civil, Special Civil and Criminal Parts.

=== Civil Part ===
The Civil Part has jurisdiction over all civil cases where the principal relief requested is sought at law (i.e. in the form of money damages), and it may grant incidental equitable relief so that a case may be fully decided in one forum. Generally, civil actions are assigned by case type into one of four tracks. The four tracks range from Track I allowing 150 days for discovery to Track IV allowing 450 days for discovery and requiring active case management by an individual judge. Effective in 2015, the New Jersey Supreme Court added a Complex Business Litigation Program (CBLP) to the Law Division. The CBLP is a type of business court, falling within Track IV. It has a specially defined jurisdiction focusing on commercial disputes, with assignment to a single judge.

=== Special Civil Part ===
The Special Civil Part essentially succeeded to the jurisdiction of the former county district courts. Cases may be filed in the Special Civil Part where the amount in controversy does not exceed $15,000 (or more if the plaintiff waives the excess). It also has a small claims section for cases involving less than $3000 and a landlord-tenant section to adjudicate summary dispossess actions.

Natural persons may act pro se. Corporations and other business entities must hire an attorney except for cases cognizable in small claims, where an authorized nonlawyer officer or employee may generally appear.

The Special Civil Part is designed to provide expedited and somewhat relaxed proceedings in smaller cases. The Special Civil Part has its own clerk in each county (rather than relying upon the Superior Court clerk's office) and many forms are available.

=== Criminal Part ===
The Criminal Part handles criminal cases for "crimes" or "indictable offenses" (what New Jersey terms offenses called felonies in other jurisdictions), which the New Jersey Constitution provides may only be brought by an indictment issued by a grand jury. The Criminal Part also hears appeals from the New Jersey municipal courts for convictions for disorderly persons offenses and petty disorderly persons offenses (what New Jersey terms offenses called misdemeanors in other jurisdictions, which do not require a grand jury indictment), as well as traffic offenses (including driving while intoxicated) and violations of municipal ordinances.

== Chancery Division ==
The Chancery Division consists of the General Equity, Probate and Family Parts. Chancery cases deal with cases where equitable relief is sought: that is, cases where one of the parties desires an injunction or other order requiring the other party/parties to do something other than pay money.

=== General Equity Part ===
The General Equity Part handles civil cases where the primary relief sought is equitable in nature, although it may grant incidental relief at law (damages). In most vicinages, only one judge is assigned to the General Equity Part, although the Assignment Judge of the vicinage may also hear general equity cases.

=== Probate Part ===
The Probate Part handles contested probate matters, guardianships etc. Usually the General Equity judge handles the probate calendar on a weekly or less frequent basis. The county surrogate acts as the deputy clerk of the Superior Court for the Probate Part in the county.

=== Family Part ===
The Family Part was created when the State Constitution was amended to eliminate the juvenile and domestic relations courts in each county and so it has the distinction of being the only part specifically mandated by the constitution.

The Family Part is responsible for all cases arising out of marriage (or marriage-like) relationships, cases about the parentage, custody, or support of children, juvenile matters and domestic violence cases. It is also the only Chancery Division part to hear appeals from the municipal courts; a party may appeal to the Family Part from the grant or denial of a temporary domestic-violence restraining order in the municipal courts.

== Organization of Trial Parts ==
The Clerk of the Superior Court is appointed by the Supreme Court and heads the centralized clerk's office; however, most pleadings are filed in the county in which the action is venued with the Deputy Clerk, Superior Court, for the county.

For administrative purposes, the State is divided into fifteen numbered vicinages. Most vicinages comprise a single county, but there are two vicinages that consist of two counties (Atlantic & Cape May Counties and Morris & Sussex Counties) and two vicinages that consist of three counties (Somerset, Hunterdon & Warren Counties and Gloucester, Cumberland & Salem County). The head of judiciary in each county is the assignment judge. The General Equity, Family, Civil and Criminal Parts in each vicinage are headed by a presiding judge.

== Appellate Division ==
"[T]he State Constitution established the Appellate Division as the upper tier of the Superior Court." "The Appellate Division was created as part of the judicial revision that took place as a result of the 1947 Constitution. Prior to 1947, the structure of the judiciary in New Jersey was extremely complex, including 'a court of errors and appeals in the last resort in all causes . . .; a court for the trial of impeachments; a court of chancery; a prerogative court; a supreme court; circuit courts, and such inferior courts as now exist, and as may be hereafter ordained and established by law . . .'"

The Appellate Division hears appeals from the Law and Chancery Divisions and final decisions of State administrative agencies. There are eight parts, designated "A" through "H," and each part has three or four judges. "The Appellate Division shall consist of such parts with such number of judges as the Chief Justice shall from time to time designate." Judges are rotated among the parts on an annual basis. "Each Part is headed by a presiding judge, who is properly addressed as 'Presiding Judge, Appellate Division.' The most senior judges of the Appellate Division serve as presiding judges of the various Parts[.]"

Unlike the federal and some other state appellate courts, appeals are not allocated among the parts on a territorial basis and Appellate Division precedent is equally binding statewide.

One of the judges on each part is designated as the presiding judge and there is an overall presiding judge for administration. Appeals are decided by a panel of two or three judges from the part to which the appeal is assigned.

If the Supreme Court has less than seven members available to hear a case, either because of vacancies or recusals, senior Appellate Division judges may be assigned to serve temporarily.

The Appellate Division has a central clerk's office that processes the filing of notices of appeal, briefs, motions and other papers.

An appeal of a final order in New Jersey must be filed within 45 days. Appeals from interlocutory orders may be made at any time before final judgment.

== Post-nominal letters ==
The Rules Governing the Courts of New Jersey provide for the use of certain post-nominal letters after the names of judges. Superior Court judges for whom no other designation is provided use "J.S.C." Appellate Division judges use the post-nominal letters "J.A.D." (or "P.J.A.D." in the case of a presiding judge). The Assignment Judge of a vicinage is designated "A.J.S.C." Presiding judges of trial court parts use "P.J.Ch." (General Equity), "P.J.F.P." (Family), P.J.Cv." (Civil) and "P.J.Cr." (Criminal) as appropriate.
