= Sib, Khuzestan =

Sib سيب
- Village
- Location within Iran
- Coordinates: 30°59′27″N 49°12′13″E
- Country: Iran
- Province: Khuzestan
- County: Ahvaz
- Bakhsh: Central
- Rural District: Gheyzaniyeh

Population (2006)
  - Total: 46
- Time zone: UTC+3:30 (IRST)
  - Summer (DST): UTC+4:30 (IRDT)

Sib (Persian: سيب, also Romanized as Sīb) is a village in Gheyzaniyeh Rural District, in the Central District of Ahvaz County, Khuzestan Province, Iran. At the 2006 census, its population was 46, in 5 families.
