= Community Innovation Survey =

The Community Innovation Surveys (CIS) are a series of surveys executed by national statistical offices throughout the European Union and in Norway and Iceland. The harmonized surveys are designed to give information on the innovativeness of different sectors and regions. Data from these surveys is used for the annual European Innovation Scoreboard and for academic research on innovation, with over 200 papers using the CIS data published.

== Surveys ==
In the 1980s, a series of individual surveys on innovation was carried out. Thereupon, the member states of the European Union decided to coordinate their efforts, and they laid down a common methodological approach to innovation research in the Oslo Manual.

This CIS surveys have been carried out:

- CIS1, 1992
- CIS2, 1996
- CIS3, 2001
- CIS4, for the reference period 2002-2004
- CIS 2006, for the reference period 2004-2006
- CIS 2008
- CIS 2010
- CIS 2012

CIS1 experienced some difficulties, partly because no standards existed yet, and partly because of a rather limited time-frame. However, it already made a first attempt at homogenization, and at comparability with non-EU surveys. In that sense it was an important step towards CIS2, even though both surveys turned out to mark a rather large number of firms as 'innovative' due to their generous definitions. The more recent surveys paid more attention to service innovations, and future surveys will also include management techniques, organisational change, design and marketing issues.

== Methodology ==
National statistical offices carry out the survey according to the EU-wide definitions of the Oslo Manual. They generally take a sample from all establishments, stratifying the sample by sector, establishment size and possibly region. For the size classes, a portion of all establishments below a certain size threshold is selected, but in most countries all large establishments receive a questionnaire. The survey is conducted at the enterprise level. Firms that organise their business activities into separate legally defined units can therefore be sampled several times.

The Community Innovation Surveys are the main data source for measuring innovation in Europe. Aggregated data are disseminated on the Eurostat webpage under CIS data. The tables cover the basic information of the enterprise, product and process innovation, innovation activity and expenditure, effects of innovation, innovation co-operation, public finding of innovation, source of information for innovation patents, etc.

The resulting micro-datasets can be accessed by researchers via the SAFE Center at the premises of Eurostat in Luxembourg or the anonymised micro-data via CD-ROMs; some countries provides also access to their micro-data on similar safe centers. Eurostat also provides access to the EU-wide dataset for selected countries. Some non-EU countries perform very similar surveys according to the same methodology. These include Canada, Australia, New Zealand and South Africa.
