= Service Implementation Bean =

A Service Implementation Bean (SIB), is a term used in Java Platform, Enterprise Edition, for a Java object implementing a web service. It can be either a POJO or a Stateless Session EJB. The Java interface of an SIB is called a Service Endpoint Interface (SEI).
