= Canadian International School (Tokyo) =

Canadian curriculum international school in Japan

Coordinates: 35.619671°N 139.733204°E

- カナディアン・インターナショナル・スクール

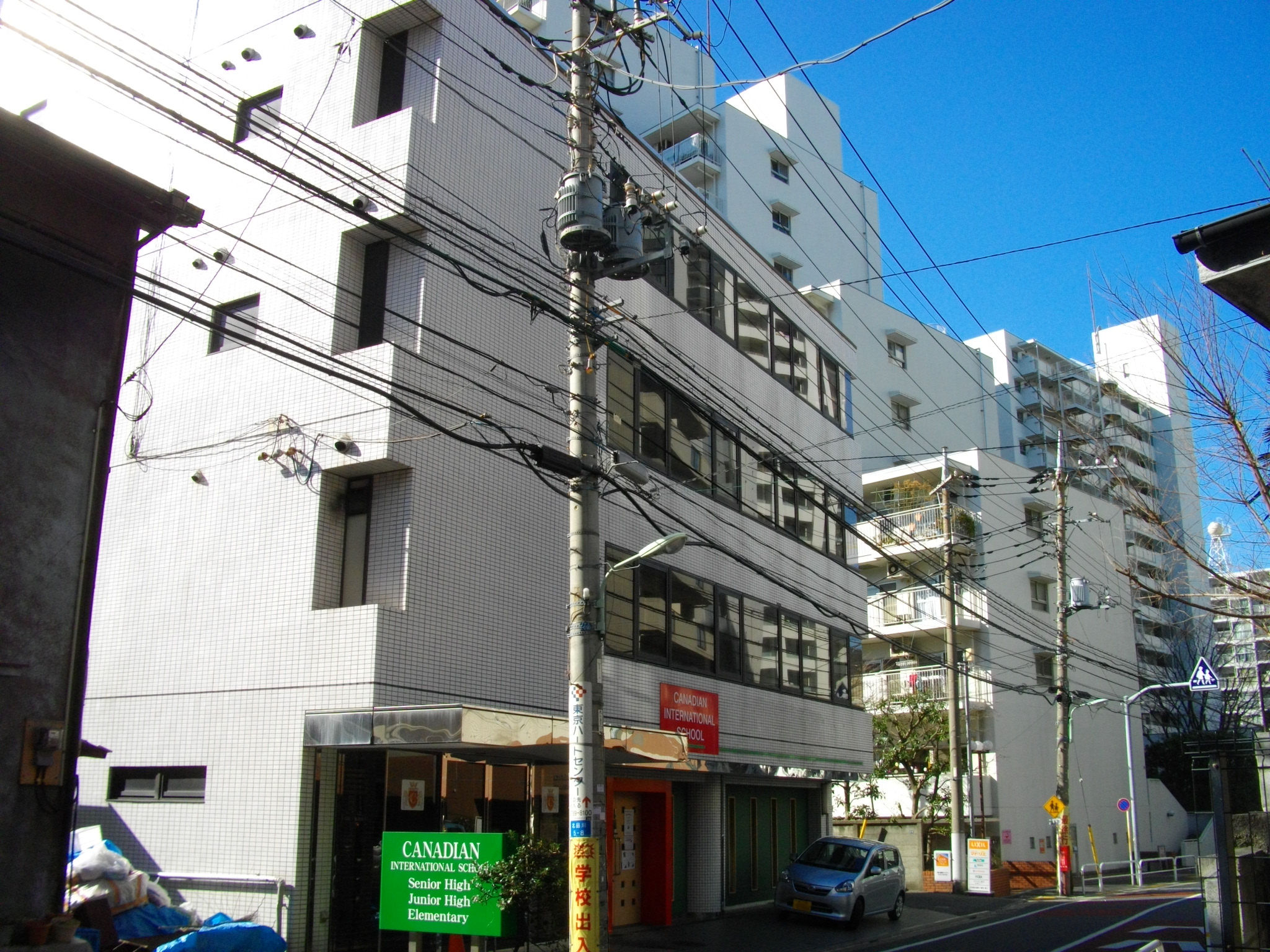

Location
- 5-8-20 Kitashinagawa; Shinagawa, Tokyo, 141-0001; Japan

Information
- Established: 1999; 27 years ago
- Grades: Pre-Kindergarten - Grade 12
- Accreditation: Western Association of Schools and Colleges; International Baccalaureate; Prince Edward Island
- Affiliation: Japan Council of International Schools; East Asia Regional Council of Overseas Schools
- Website: www.cisjapan.net

The Canadian International School in Tokyo (Japanese: カナディアン・インターナショナル・スクール, romanized: Kanadian Intānashonaru Sukūru) is a Canadian curriculum international school in Tokyo, with campuses in Kitashinagawa, Shinagawa and Nakameguro, Meguro.

== History ==
Canadian International School Tokyo was founded in 1999 by two directors. The school established a relationship with the Department of Education of the Canadian province of Prince Edward Island to adopt its curriculum. The provincial government records the school's affiliation date as 1 July 1999. In 2009, the school received authorization to offer the International Baccalaureate Primary Years Programme.

It was founded with 50 students, with the expansion of the Nakameguro campus for the kindergarten and elementary schools, and has grown to its current student population of over 500.

== Curriculum ==
CIS is accredited by the Department of Education of the Canadian province of Prince Edward Island (PEI) whose curriculum is used throughout the school. CIS offers pre-Kindergarten to grade 12, with students attending universities in Canada, the United States and Japan, as well as countries in Europe. Just under 35% of CIS students are Japanese, with 30% coming from Korea, and the remainder from Denmark, France, Germany, Italy, China, Brazil, South Africa, Saudi Arabia, Canada, Kuwait, Iraq, and more.

CIS provides curriculum enrichment and enhancement by way of the International Baccalaureate program in kindergarten to grade 5, and Advanced Placement readiness and courses in grades 9 to 12. There are up to 8 Advanced Placement courses available in the high school section.

In addition to a full academic program, the curriculum includes music, PE, art and Japanese language at all grade levels. These are taught at all levels by specialist teachers, with the exception of Japanese beginning in the first grade. CIS provides English language support for students whose English language skills are just below grade level. However, students are required to be within reach of Canadian grade level English language expectations with the support provided.

Canadians, Australians, Americans, and Brits all teach at the school. All teachers regardless of nationality are required to hold professional teacher certification from Canada, including extensive background checks and academic background confirmation by ministries of education in Canada.

In addition to PEI accreditation, CIS is accredited by the Western Association of Schools and Colleges (WASC), the International Baccalaureate Organization (IBO), and is a member of the Japan Council of International Schools and the East Asia Regional Council of Overseas Schools (EARCOS).

Alternative view of the building

== Notable alumni ==
- Mira Hasegawa, fashion model of White South African and Japanese descent
- Takane Hosoyama, Chartered Financial Analyst and former tarento
- Kei Komuro, lawyer and husband of Mako Komuro

== See also ==
- List of high schools in Tokyo
