= Kyoto International School =

Coordinates: 35°1′28.66″N 135°45′3.75″E

Location
- 317 Kitatawara-cho, Kamigyo-ku, Kyoto, Kyoto Prefecture

Information
- Founded: 1957
- Website: kis.ac.jp

Kyoto International School (KIS), formerly Kyoto Christian Day School, is an international school in Kyoto, Japan, founded in 1957. It serves students from 3 to 16 years old. The school has been accredited by the Western Association of Schools and Colleges (WASC) since 1992 and authorised by the International Baccalaureate Organisation (IBO) since 2006.

KIS has an enrollment of approximately 130 students from around 20 countries.

The school is divided into four parts: Early Years, Primary, Middle School and High School.

KIS also offers an English immersion program on Saturdays for students aged 3 to 12 years old.
