= Case Information Statement =

A Case Information Statement (or Cover Sheet) is a document which is filed with a court clerk at the commencement of a civil lawsuit in many of the court systems of the United States. It is generally filed along with the complaint. Some states use similar documents for criminal cases as well.

== Purpose and terminology ==
The purpose of a Case Information Statement is to let the judge and court clerk know what type of case is being brought by the parties, so that they can better prepare for the case to come to trial. Some courts (for example, the New Jersey Superior Court) put different types of cases on different "tracks", to place limits on how long discovery they should take.

If the lawyer filling out the Case Information Statement makes a mistake, or if circumstances change or new information is discovered, the party wishing to amend the statement may do so by making a motion to the judge in charge of the case.

Some courts use the term Cover Sheet for this document, but the content and purpose is the same. For example, the equivalent document in federal district courts is Form JS-44, Civil Cover Sheet. Similarly, the Superior Courts of California have a Form CM-010, Civil Case Cover Sheet.

== Case Information Statements in civil cases ==
Questions typically asked on Civil Case Information Statements include:

- The underlying subject matter of the lawsuit
- Amount in controversy or remedies demanded
- Whether a jury trial is requested by either party
- Whether there are additional parties to be joined
- Whether the lawsuit is a potential class action or some other type of complex case
- Whether there are similar actions pending in other courts
- What, if any, previous relationship exists between/among the parties (e.g. employment, familial, business associates, etc.)
- Whether attorney fees are in contention (in some types of cases, attorney fees must be paid by the losing party)

In family law cases (such as divorce and child custody matters), the questions asked on the Case Information Statement are often longer and more detailed, requiring recitation of each party's employment situation, current income, and the assets and liabilities of each party.

== Case Information Statements in criminal cases ==
Questions typically asked on Criminal Case Information Statements include:

- The attorneys involved in the case
- The basic facts and circumstances involved
- Whether the defendant is currently in custody or out on bail
- Whether there are co-defendants
- Whether all issues will be disposed of by this case
- Whether the constitutionality of any statute, regulation, or executive order is being challenged

== New York's Request for Judicial Intervention ==
New York's equivalent document is the Request for Judicial Intervention, which is necessary because in New York a case begins with the service of a complaint after filing with a local County Clerk. Thus, a New York Supreme Court Justice's involvement in a case will not take place until absolutely necessary (usually because a discovery dispute develops, someone wants to file a dispositive motion, or it is actually time for trial). At that time, the party seeking judicial intervention files a RJI (which asks for information similar to a CIS or cover sheet) and files with the court all relevant documents from the party's own version of the case file.
