= Special Investigation Team (India) =

Team appointed to investigate serious crimes

A Special Investigation Team (SIT) in India is a team appointed for investigation of serious crimes when the existing force is insufficient for the probe. The Supreme Court of India, Union Government of India and state government have the power to direct the officials involved in a case.
