= List of international schools in Japan =

This is a list of international schools in Japan.

== By location ==
=== Akita ===
- KBH International School Japan Semboku

=== Chubu ===
- UWC ISAK Japan

=== Hokkaido ===
- Hokkaido International School

=== Ibaraki ===
- Tsukuba International School

=== Kanagawa ===
- Horizon Japan International School
- Saint Maur International School
- Yokohama International School

=== Kobe ===
- Canadian Academy
- Marist Brothers International School

=== Osaka ===
- Osaka International School
- Osaka YMCA International School

=== Kyoto ===
- KIU Academy
- Kyoto International School
- Lycée français international de Kyoto

=== Nagano ===
- UWC ISAK Japan

=== Nagoya ===
- Nagoya International School
- NUCB International College

=== Saitama ===
- Columbia International School

=== Sendai ===
- Tohoku International School

=== Tokyo ===
- American School in Japan
- Aoba-Japan International School
- Canadian International School, Tokyo
- Christian Academy in Japan
- Global Indian International School, Tokyo
- Gyosei International School
- Horizon Japan International School
- India International School in Japan
- International School of the Sacred Heart
- K. International School Tokyo
- Laurus International School of Science Tokyo
- Lycée Français International de Tokyo
- New International School (Tokyo)
- Nishimachi International School
- Seisen International School
- St. Mary's International School
- The British School in Tokyo
- Tokyo International School
- Tokyo West International School

=== Okinawa ===
- Okinawa Christian School International

== See also ==
- List of schools in Japan
- List of international schools
