= Japanese people in Germany =

- Distribution of Japanese citizens in Germany (2021)

Total population
- 78,423 (with Japanese ancestry); 0.085% of the German Population; 36,960 (Japanese citizens); 0.045% of the German Population

Regions with significant populations
- Düsseldorf • Berlin • Frankfurt • Munich • Hamburg

Languages
- German • Japanese ・ English

There is a community of Japanese people in Germany (Japanese: 日系ドイツ人, romanized: Nikkei Doitsujin; German: Japanisch Deutsch) consisting mainly of expatriates from Japan as well as German citizens of Japanese descent.

== Demographics ==
In 1933 Berlin was the home of about 20% of all of the Japanese people in Europe and Germany had become a centre for Japanese people sent by the Japanese Ministry of Education to study in Europe. In 1936 the Japanese people were declared Honorary Aryans by the Nazis. At the time of the 1941 Attack on Pearl Harbor about 300 Japanese people lived in Berlin. Around that time fewer than 200 Japanese women and children previously in Germany returned to Japan by ship. They boarded the Yasukunimaru, a ship operated by NYK Line, in Hamburg.

In 1963 there were 800 Japanese people in Hamburg, including 50 children.

In 1985 there were about 16,500 Japanese persons living in West Germany. The largest group, making up about 6,000, resided in Düsseldorf, and there were other Japanese communities in Berlin and Hamburg. At this time, over 90% of ethnic Japanese households in West Germany had an affluent corporate executive as the head of the household. This executive often stayed in Germany for three to five years, and company employees arriving in Germany often move into residences formerly occupied by those returning to Japan.

Number of Japanese in larger cities
#	City	People
1.	Düsseldorf	8,329
2.	Berlin	4,369
3.	Frankfurt	3,363
4.	Munich	3,082
5.	Hamburg	2,476
6.	Cologne	2,294
7.	Hanover	1,433
8.	Bonn	1,284
9.	Bremen	1,238
10.	Dresden	1,038

== Tourism ==
In 1975, 195,350 Japanese people visited West Germany. In 1984 that figure was about 400,000.

Today Germany has about 700,000 Japanese tourists per year and is one of the popular tourist countries to Japanese people. Most popular destinations of Japanese people are Berlin, Black Forest, Bremen, Cologne Cathedral, Dresden, Freiburg, Heidelberg Castle, Munich, Neuschwanstein Castle and Rothenburg ob der Tauber.

== Institutions ==
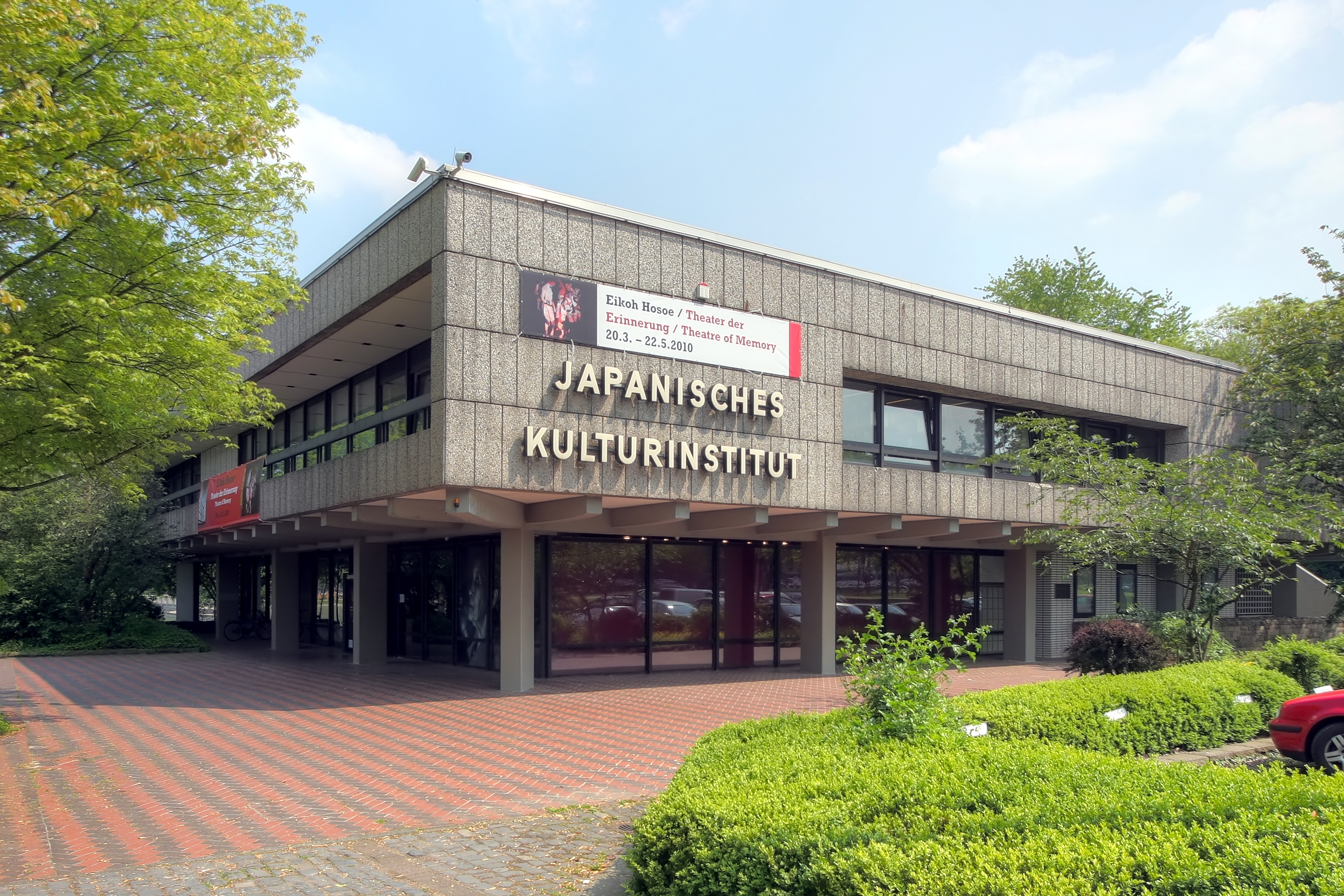
Building of the "Japanisches Kulturinstitut" in Cologne, Germany

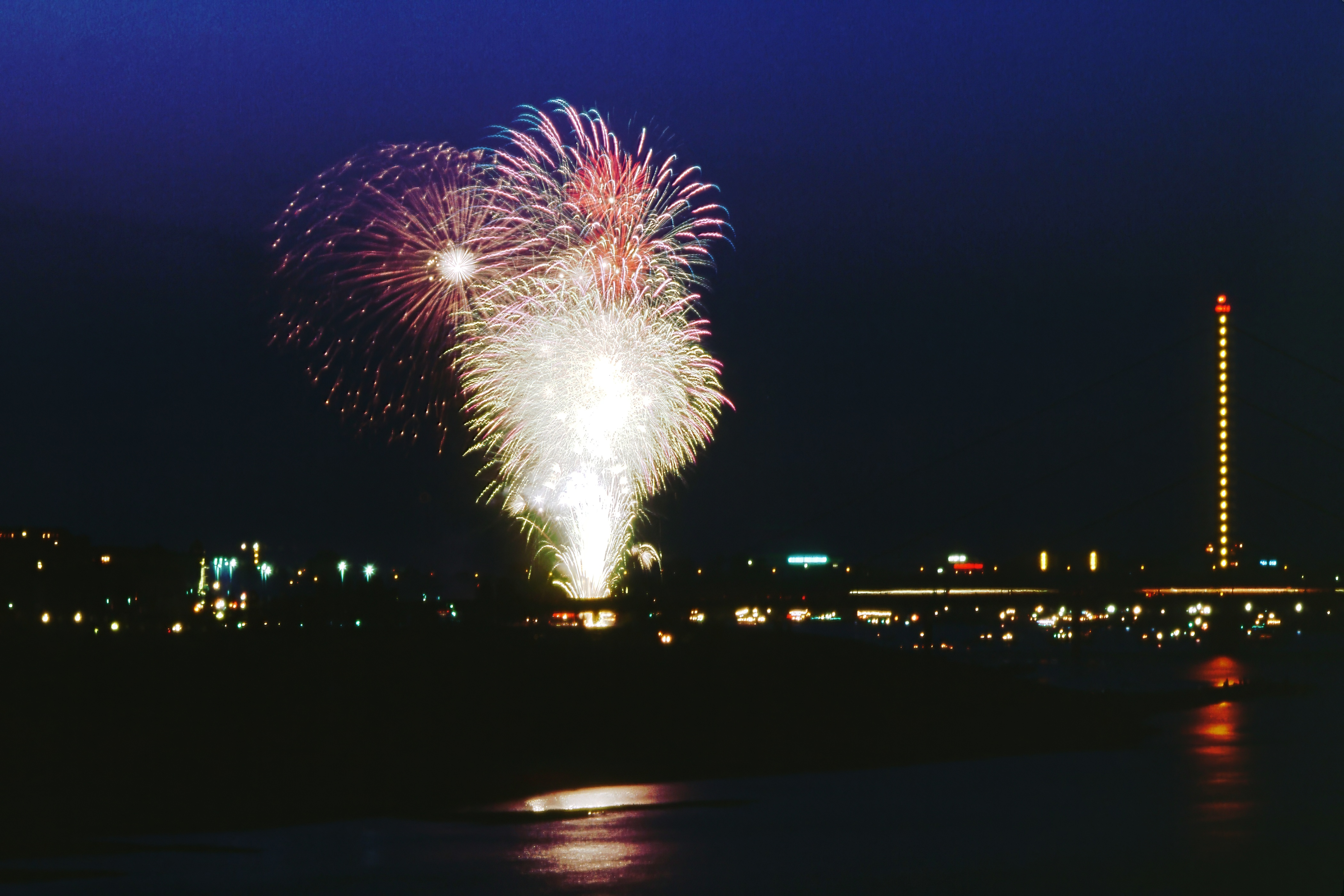
Fireworks of the 1983 Japan Week, the precursor of the Japan Day

There are few Japanese institutions in Germany. The largest one is the Japanese Culture Institute in Cologne which is owned by Japan Foundation. It was made in 1969 at the time of West Germany. Other known Japanese centers in Germany are the German-Japanese Center and Ekō-House of Japanese Culture in Düsseldorf, Japanese-German Center in Berlin and Japanese Culture Center in Frankfurt. There are also German-Japanese society in each federal states and mostly in its largest cities.

There are also few German museums that has associations with Japan, including Bonsai Museum in Düsseldorf, Japan Art - Gallery Friedrich Müller in Frankfurt, Japanese Palace in Dresden, Mitsuko Castle in Thürkow, Mori Ōgai Memorial Hall in Berlin, Museum Five Continents in Munich, Museum of East Asian Art in Cologne, Samurai Museum in Berlin and Siebold Museum in Würzburg.

There are also many Japanese festival in Germany. The largest of its theme is the Japan Day in Düsseldorf which take place in May or June every year and has visitors of over 600,000. Japan Day features the sale of Japanese foods, drinks, materials and goods, with many stands located on the Rhine river with a firework in the late evening. There are also known Japanese festivals including the Cherry Blossom Festival in Hamburg, German-Japanese Summer Festival in Hanover, Japanfest in Munich, Japanese Light Festival Dortmund, in Main Matsuri in Frankfurt. Also many Japanese film festivals in Germany, the largest one is Nippon Connection in Frankfurt and many Japanese convention, most of them are associated with manga and Cosplays, including AnimagiC in Mannheim, Connichi in Kassel, Contaku in Magdeburg and NipponCon in Bremen.

== Education ==
Locations of day schools (nihonjin gakkō and shiritsu zaigai kyoiku shisetsu) in Germany (Grey dots refer to closed schools.)
Locations of supplementary schools (hoshū jugyō kō) in Germany

There are five nihonjin gakkō (Japanese international elementary and junior schools operated by Japanese associations) in Germany:

- Japanische Internationale Schule zu Berlin
- Japanische Internationale Schule in Düsseldorf
- Japanische Internationale Schule Frankfurt
- Japanische Schule in Hamburg
- Japanische Internationale Schule München

The Toin Gakuen Schule Deutschland, a Japanese boarding high school/gymnasium in Bad Saulgau classified as a shiritsu zaigai kyōiku shisetsu (overseas branch of a Japanese private school) was scheduled to close in 2012.

Hoshū jugyō kō (supplementary/weekend Japanese schools) include:

- Japanische Ergänzungsschule in Berlin e.V. (ベルリン日本語補習授業校 Berurin Nihongo Hoshū Jugyō Kō) - Charlottenburg-Wilmersdorf, Berlin
- Zentrale Schule fur Japanisch Berlin e.V. (共益法人ベルリン中央学園補習授業校 Kyōeki Hōjin Berurin Chūō Gakuen Hoshū Jugyō Kō) - Wilmersdorf, Berlin - Established April 1997.
- Japanische Schule Bonn e.V. (ボン日本語補習授業校 Bon Nihongo Hoshū Jugyō Kō)
- Japanisches Institut in Bremen (ブレーメン日本語補習授業校 Burēmen Nihongo Hoshū Jugyō Kō)
- Japanische Schule Köln e.V. (ケルン日本語補習授業校 Kerun Nihongo Hoshū Jugyō Kō) - Kalk, Cologne
- Japanische Ergänzungsschule in Dresden (ドレスデン日本語補習校 Doresuden Nihongo Hoshūkō)
- Japanische Ergänzungsschule in Düsseldorf
- Forderschule fur Japankunde in Düsseldorf e.V.
- Japanisches Institut Frankfurt am Main (フランクフルト補習学校 Furankufuruto Hoshū Jugyō Kō)
  - It conducts its classes in the Japanese day school of Frankfurt's building.
- Japanisches Institut Hamburg (ハンブルグ補習授業校 Hanburugu Hoshū Jugyō Kō) - Halstenbek
  - It was established on June 15, 1963. It has conducted its classes at the Japanische Schule in Hamburg since 1994. As of 2013 it has 100 students, with about 70% of them from mixed Japanese and German relationships. The school has mathematics, geography, and Japanese history classes, all taught in the Japanese language. As of 2013 pupils under 15 years of age have tuitions of 84 euros per month per child while those 15 and older have tuitions of 100 euros per month per child.
- Japanische Ergänzungsschule Heidelberg e.V. (ハイデルベルク日本語授業補習校 Haideruberugu Nihongo Hoshū Jugyō Kō)
- Japanisches Institut in München e.V. (JIM; ミュンヘン日本語補習授業校 Myunhen Nihongo Hoshū Jugyō Kō) - Munich
  - Usually the school holds its classes in the Mathilde-Eller Schule but if that location is unavailable it holds its classes in the Munich Japanese day school building.
- Japanische Kulturvereinigung in Nurnberg e.V. (ニュンベルグ補習授業校 Nyunberugu Hoshū Jugyō Kō) - Nuremberg
- Japanische Schule Stuttgart e.V. (シュツットガルト日本語補習授業校 Shutsuttogaruto Nihongo Hoshū Jugyō Kō)
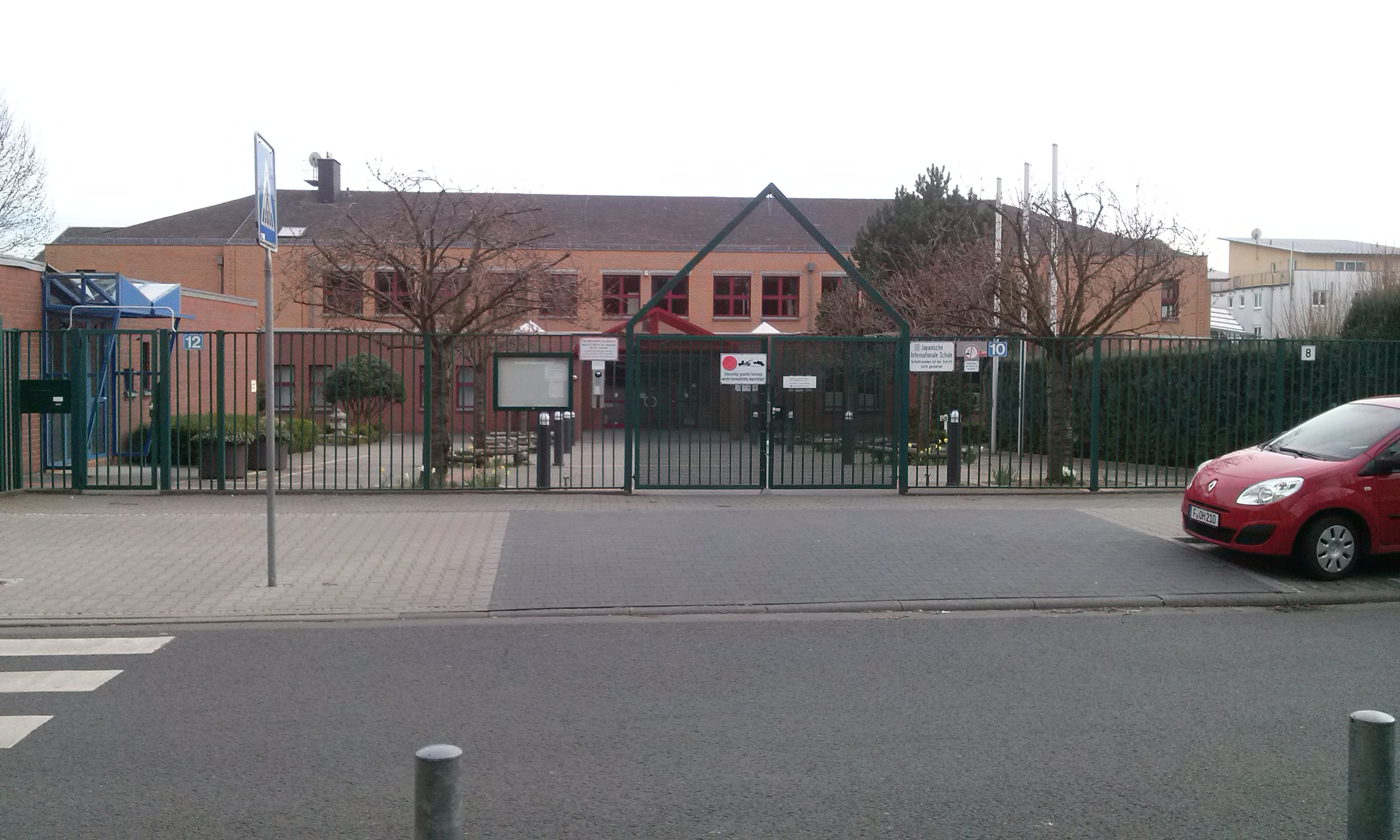
Japanische Internationale Schule Frankfurt

== Notable individuals ==
- Ida Friederike Görres, writer and the younger sister of Richard von Coudenhove-Kalergi
- Ken Asaeda, footballer
- Blumio, rapper
- Kimiko Douglass-Ishizaka, pianist, Olympic weightlifter and powerlifter
- Nic Endo, musician
- Erika Ikuta, musical actress
- Sadakichi Hartmann, photography critic and poet
- Tetsuya Kakihara, voice actor and singer
- Rubina Kuraoka, voice actress
- Liza Kennedy, fashion model
- Jun Märkl, conductor
- Alice Sara Ott, pianist
- Yuki Stalph, footballer
- Arabella Steinbacher, violinist
- Damo Suzuki, musician
- Mari Vartmann, pair skater
- Subaru Kimura, voice actor
- Takeo Ishii, yodeler
- Yoko Tawada, writer

=== Fictional people ===
- Sylphynford and her older brother Alex Tachibana from Himouto! Umaru-chan

== See also ==
- Germany–Japan relations
- List of Japanese ministers, envoys and ambassadors to Germany
- Japanese diaspora
