= Caritas Girls' Junior & Senior High School =

School in Kawasaki, Kanagawa Prefecture, Japan

- Japanese: カリタス女子中学校・高等学校; French: École secondaire Caritas

- The school in 2009

Location
- 4-6-1 Nakanoshima; Tama-ku; Kawasaki, Kanagawa Prefecture, 214-0012; Japan; 35.6294°N 139.5588°E

Information
- Religious affiliation: Catholicism
- Established: 1961; 65 years ago
- Website: www.caritas.ed.jp

Caritas Girls' Junior & Senior High School (カリタス女子中学高等学校, Karitasu Joshi Chūgakkō Kōtōgakkō; French: École secondaire Caritas) is a girls' private secondary school in Tama-ku, Kawasaki, Kanagawa Prefecture, Japan.

Roman Catholic nuns from Quebec established the school in 1961.

== See also ==
- List of junior high schools in Kanagawa Prefecture
