= Japanische Internationale Schule Frankfurt =

- フランクフルト日本人国際学校
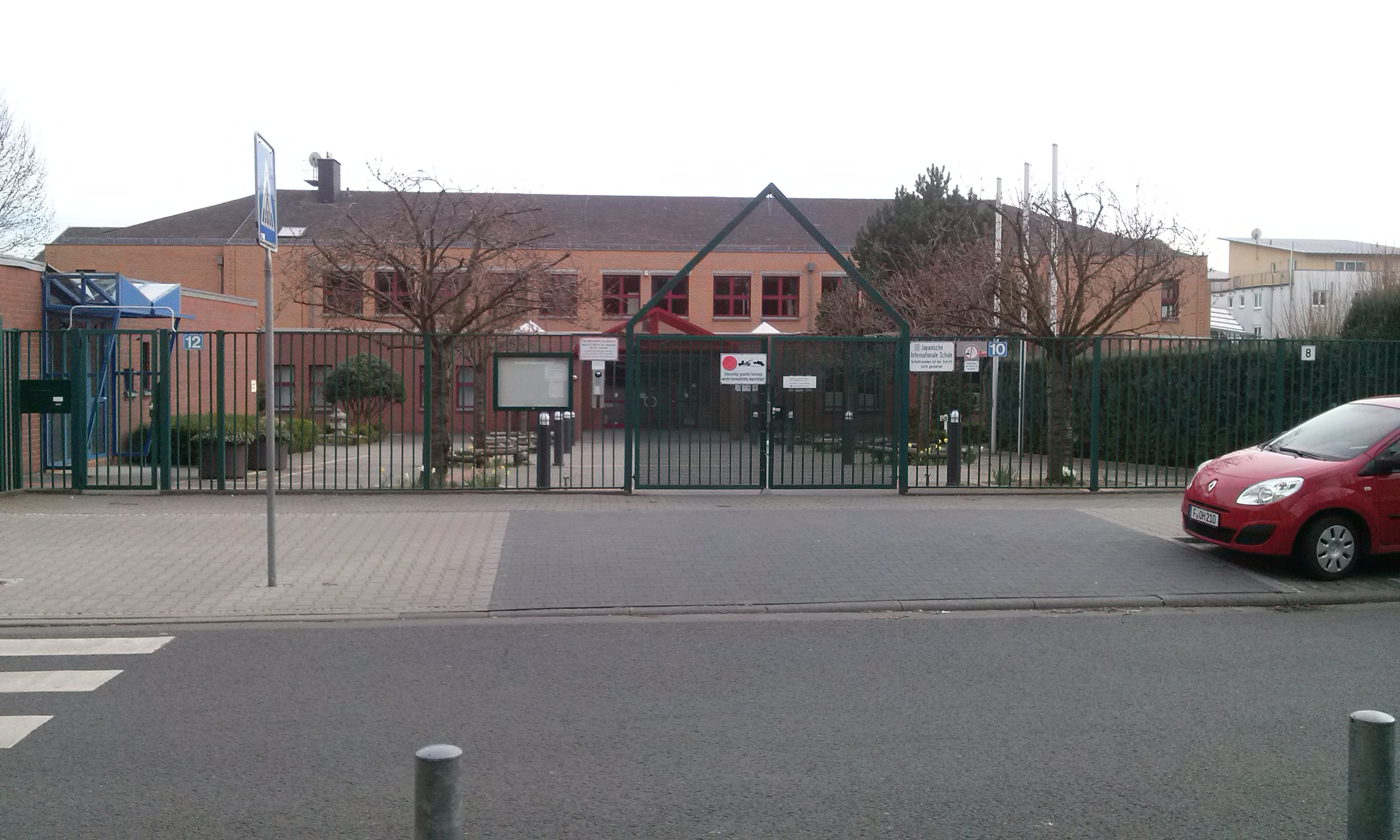
- School Entrance in April, 2015

Location
- Langweidenstrasse 8-12 60488 Frankfurt am Main; Frankfurt am Main; Germany; 50.1317°N 8.6305°E

Information
- Type: Primary & middle school
- Grades: 1-9
- Website: jisf.de

Japanische Internationale Schule Frankfurt e.V. (フランクフルト日本人国際学校, Furankufuruto Nihonjin Kokusai Gakkō; JISF) is a Japanese international school in Frankfurt - Hausen, Germany.

The Japanisches Institut Frankfurt am Main e.V. (フランクフルト補習授業校 Furankufuruto Hoshū Jugyō Kō), a Japanese weekend supplementary school, conducts its classes in the same building.

It was first established on April 21, 1985 (Showa 60). As of FY2022, a total of 207 students were enrolled at JISF, with 34 staffs working at the school. Of the students, 164 were in grades 1 to 6 while 43 were in 7 to 9.

== See also ==
- Japanese people in Germany
- German international schools in Japan:
  - German School Tokyo Yokohama - in Yokohama, Japan
  - Deutsche Schule Kobe/European School
