= List of elementary schools in Kanagawa Prefecture =

This is a list of elementary schools in Kanagawa Prefecture, Japan.

== Municipal ==
=== Yokohama ===
==== Aoba-ku ====
- Aobadai (青葉台)
- Azamino Daiichi (No. 1) (あざみ野第一)
- Azamino Daini (No. 2) (あざみ野第二)
- Edanishi (West) (荏田西)
- Ekoda (荏子田)
- Enokigaoka (榎が丘)
- Fujigaoka (藤が丘)
- Ichigao (市ケ尾)
- Kamoshida Daiichi (鴨志田第一)
- Kamoshida Midori (鴨志田緑)
- Katsura (桂)
- Kenzan (嶮山)
- Kurogane (鉄)
- Kurosuda (黒須田)
- Mitakedai (みたけ台)
- Motoishikawa (元石川)
- Nara (奈良)
- Onda (恩田)
- Satsukigaoka (さつきが丘)
- Shinishikawa (新石川)
- Tana (田奈)
- Tsutsujigaoka (つつじが丘)
- Utsukushigaoka (美しが丘)
- Utsukushigaoka Higashi (East) (美しが丘東)
- Utsukushigaoka Nishi (美しが丘西)
- Yamauchi (山内)
- Yamoto (谷本)

==== Asahi-ku ====
- Fudōmaru (不動丸)
- Futamatagawa (二俣川)
- Higashi-Kibōgaoka (東希望が丘)
- Honjuku (本宿)
- Ichisawa (市沢)
- Imajuku (今宿)
- Imajuku-Minami (今宿南)
- Kami-kawai (上川井)
- Kami-shirane (上白根)
- Kawai (川井)
- Kibōgaoka (希望ケ丘)
- Makigahara (万騎が原)
- Minami-Honjuku (南本宿)
- Nakao (中尾)
- Nakazawa (中沢)
- Sachigaoka (さちが丘)
- Sakon-yama (左近山)
- Sasanodai (笹野台)
- Shiki-no-mori (四季の森)
- Shirane (白根)
- Tsuoka (都岡)
- Tsurugamine (鶴ケ峯)
- Wakabadai (若葉台)
- Zenbu (善部)

==== Hodogaya-ku ====
- Arai (新井)
- Bukkō (仏向)
- Fujimidai (富士見台)
- Fujizuka (藤塚)
- Gontazaka (権太坂)
- Hatsunegaoka (初音が丘)
- Hodogaya (保土ケ谷)
- Hoshikawa (星川)
- Imai (今井)
- Iwasaki (岩崎)
- Kamihoshikawa (上星川)
- Kamisugeta Sasa no Oka (上菅田笹の丘)
- Katabira (帷子)
- Kawashima (川島)
- Mine (峯)
- Sakamoto (坂本)
- Sakuradai (桜台)
- Setogaya (瀬戸ケ谷)
- Tokiwadai (常盤台)

==== Isogo-ku ====
- Bairin (梅林)
- Byōbugaura (屏風浦)
- Hama (浜)
- Isogo (磯子)
- Mori-higashi (森東)
- Negishi (根岸)
- Okamura (岡村)
- Sannōdai (山王台)
- Sawanosato (さわの里)
- Shiomidai (汐見台)
- Sugita (杉田)
- Takigashira (滝頭)
- Yōkōdai-Dai-ichi (洋光台第一)
- Yōkōdai-Daini (洋光台第二)
- Yōkōdai-Daisan (No. 3) (洋光台第三)
- Yōkōdai-Daiyon (No. 4) (洋光台第四)

==== Izumi-ku ====
- Higashi-nakada (東中田)
- Iidakita-Ichō (飯田北いちょう)
- Iseyama (伊勢山)
- Izumi (和泉)
- Izumino (いずみ野)
- Kami-Iida (上飯田)
- Kuzuno (葛野)
- Nakada (中田)
- Nakawada (中和田)
- Nakawada-minami (中和田南)
- Nishigaoka (西が岡)
- Okazu (岡津)
- Shimo-Izumi (下和泉)
- Shinbashi (新橋)

==== Kanagawa-ku ====
- Aoki (青木)
- Futatsuya (二谷)
- Hazawa (羽沢)
- Kamihashi (神橋)
- Kanagawa (神奈川)
- Kandaiji (神大寺)
- Kōgaya (幸ケ谷)
- Koyasu (子安)
- Minami-Kandaiji (南神大寺)
- Mitsuzawa (三ツ沢)
- Nakamaru (中丸)
- Nishiterao (西寺尾)
- Nishiterao-Daini (No. 2) (西寺尾第二)
- Ōguchidai (大口台)
- Saitobun (斎藤分)
- Shirahata (白幡)
- Sugetanooka (菅田の丘)
- Urashima (浦島)

==== Kanazawa-ku ====
Nishi Kanazawa Elementary/Junior High School a.k.a. Nishi Kanazawa Gakuen (西金沢学園) is a combined elementary and junior high school in Kanazawa-ku.

Elementary schools:

- Asahina (朝比奈)
- Bunko (文庫)
- Daido (大道)
- Hakkei (八景)
- Kamariya (釜利谷)
- Kamariya Higashi (釜利谷東)
- Kamariya Minami (釜利谷南)
- Kanazawa (金沢)
- Koda (小田)
- Mutsuura (六浦)
- Mutsuura Minami (六浦南)
- Nishi Shiba (西柴)
- Nishi Tomioka (西富岡)
- Nokendai (能見台)
- Nokendai Minami (能見台南)
- Segasaki (瀬ケ崎)
- Takafunedai (高舟台)
- Tomiki Chuo (Central) (並木中央)
- Tomiki Daiichi (No. 1) (並木第一)
- Tomiki Daiyon (No. 4) (並木第四)
- Tomioka (富岡)

==== Kohoku-ku ====
- Futoo (太尾)
- Hiyoshidai (日吉台)
- Hiyoshiminami (日吉南)
- Kikuna (菊名)
- Kitatsunashima (北綱島)
- Kohoku (港北)
- Komabayashi (駒林)
- Kozukue (小机)
- Mamedo (大豆戸)
- Minowa (箕輪)
- Morooka (師岡)
- Nitta (新田)
- Nippa (新羽)
- Osone (大曽根)
- Otsuna (大綱)
- Shimoda (下田)
- Shinohara (篠原)
- Shinohara Nishi (篠原西)
- Shin Yoshida (新吉田)
- Shin Yoshida Daini (No. 2) (新吉田第二)
- Shirosato (城郷)
- Takata (高田)
- Takata Higashi (高田東)
- Tsunashima (綱島)
- Tsunashima Higashi (綱島東)
- Yagami (矢上)

==== Konan-ku ====
Elementary schools:

- Higiriyama (日限山)
- Hino (日野)
- Hino-minami (日野南)
- Hishita (日下)
- Kami-Ōoka (上大岡)
- Kōnandai-Dai-ichi (No. 1) (港南台第一)
- Kōnandai-Daini (No. 2) (港南台第二)
- Kōnandai-Daisan (No. 3) (港南台第三)
- Kotsubo (小坪)
- Maruyamadai (丸山台)
- Minamidai (南台)
- Nagano (永野)
- Nagaya (永谷)
- Noba-Suzukake (野庭すずかけ)
- Sakuraoka (桜岡)
- Serigaya (芹が谷)
- Serigaya-minami (芹が谷南)
- Shimonagaya (下永谷)
- Shimonoba (下野庭)
- Sōbuyama (相武山)
- Yoshihara (吉原)

==== Midori-ku ====
There is a combined elementary and junior high school, Kirigaoka Gakuen (霧が丘学園).

Municipal elementary schools:

- Higashi Hongo (東本郷)
- Ibukino (いぶき野)
- Kamiyama (上山)
- Kamoi (鴨居)
- Midori (緑)
- Miho (三保)
- Morinodai (森の台)
- Nagatsuta (長津田)
- Nagatsuta Daini (No. 2) (長津田第二)
- Nakayama (中山)
- Niiharu (新治)
- Takeyama (竹山)
- Tokaichiba (十日市場)
- Yamashita (山下)
- Yamashita Midoridai (山下みどり台)

==== Minami-ku ====
- Bessho (別所)
- Fujinoki (藤の木)
- Hie (日枝)
- Idogaya (井土ケ谷)
- Ishikawa (石川)
- Maita (蒔田)
- Minami (南)
- Minami Ota (南太田)
- Minami Yoshida (南吉田)
- Mutsukawa (六つ川)
- Mutsukawadai (六つ川台)
- Mutsukawa Nishi (六つ川西)
- Nagata (永田)
- Nagatadai (永田台)
- Nakamura (中村)
- Ooka (大岡)
- Ota (太田)

==== Naka-ku ====
- Honcho (本町)
- Honmoku (本牧)
- Honmoku Minami (本牧南)
- Kitagata (北方)
- Makado (間門)
- Motomachi (元街)
- Otori (大鳥)
- Tateno (立野)
- Yamamoto (山元)

==== Nishi-ku ====
- Azuma (東)
- Hiranuma (平沼)
- Inaridai (稲荷台)
- Ipponmatsu (一本松)
- Minato Mirai Honcho (みなとみらい本町)
- Miyagaya (宮谷)
- Nishimae (西前)
- Sengendai (浅間台)
- Tobe (戸部)

==== Sakae-ku ====
- Hongō (本郷)
- Hongōdai (本郷台)
- Iijima (飯島)
- Kamigō (上郷)
- Kasama (笠間)
- Katsuradai (桂台)
- Kosugaya (小菅ケ谷)
- Koyamadai (小山台)
- Kuden (公田)
- Nishihongō (西本郷)
- Sakurai (桜井)
- Senshū (千秀)
- Shōdo (庄戸)
- Toyoda (豊田)

==== Seya-ku ====
- Aizawa (相沢)
- Akuwa (阿久和)
- Daimon (大門)
- Futatsubashi (二つ橋)
- Hara (原)
- Kami-seya (上瀬谷)
- Minami-seya (南瀬谷)
- Mitsukyō (三ツ境)
- Seya (瀬谷)
- Seya-Daini (No. 2) (瀬谷第二)
- Seya-Sakura (瀬谷さくら)

==== Totsuka-ku ====
- Akiba (秋葉)
- Fukaya (深谷)
- Gumisawa (汲沢)
- Higashi-gumisawa (東汲沢)
- Higashi-matano (東俣野)
- Higashi-shinano (東品濃)
- Higashi-totsuka (東戸塚)
- Hirado (平戸)
- Hiradodai (平戸台)
- Kamiyabe (上矢部)
- Kashio (柏尾)
- Kawakami (川上)
- Kawakami-kita (川上北)
- Kosuzume (小雀)
- Kurata (倉田)
- Maioka (舞岡)
- Minami-maioka (南舞岡)
- Minami-totsuka (南戸塚)
- Nase (名瀬)
- Sakaigi (境木)
- Shimogō (下郷)
- Shinano (品濃)
- Taishō (大正)
- Torigaoka (鳥が丘)
- Totsuka (戸塚)
- Yabe (矢部)
- Yokohama Fukayadai (横浜深谷台)

Former elementary schools:

- Matano (俣野) - Merged into Fukayadai Elementary (深谷台小学校) in 2017 to form Yokohama Fukayadai Elementary.

==== Tsurumi-ku ====
- Asahi (旭)
- Baba (馬場)
- Heian (平安)
- Higashidai (東台)
- Ichiba (市場)
- Irifune (入船)
- Kamisueyoshi (上末吉)
- Kamiterao (上寺尾)
- Kishiya (岸谷)
- Komaoka (駒岡)
- Namamugi (生麦)
- Shimosueyoshi (下末吉)
- Shin Tsurumi (新鶴見)
- Shioiri (汐入)
- Shishigaya (獅子ケ谷)
- Shitanoya (下野谷)
- Sueyoshi (末吉)
- Terao (寺尾)
- Toyooka (豊岡)
- Tsurumi (鶴見)
- Ushioda (潮田)
- Yako (矢向)

==== Tsuzuki-ku ====
- Chigasaki (茅ケ崎)
- Chigasakidai (茅ケ崎台)
- Chigasaki-higashi (茅ケ崎東)
- Eda (荏田)
- Edahigashi-Dai-ichi (荏田東第一)
- Edaminami (荏田南)
- Higashi-yamata (東山田)
- Kachida (勝田)
- Kawawa (川和)
- Kawawa-higashi (川和東)
- Kita-yamata (北山田)
- Minami-yamata (南山田)
- Nakagawa (中川)
- Nakagawa-nishi (中川西)
- Orimoto (折本)
- Sumiregaoka (すみれが丘)
- Tsuda (都田)
- Tsuda-nishi (都田西)
- Tsuzuki (都筑)
- Tsuzuki-no-oka (つづきの丘)
- Ushikubo (牛久保)
- Yamata (山田)

=== Kawasaki ===
==== Asao-ku ====
Municipal elementary schools:

- Asao (麻生小学校)
- Chiyogaoka (千代ヶ丘小学校)
- Haruhino (はるひ野小学校)
- Higashi Kakio (東柿生小学校)
- Kakio (柿生小学校)
- Kanahodo (金程小学校)
- Katahira (片平小学校)
- Kurigidai (栗木台小学校)
- Minami Yurigaoka (南百合丘小学校)
- Nagasawa (長沢小学校)
- Nijigaoka (虹ヶ丘小学校)
- Nishiikuta (西生田小学校)
- Okagami (岡上小学校)
- Ozenji Chuo (王禅寺中央小学校)
- Shinpukuji (真福寺小学校)
- Yurigaoka (百合丘小学校)

Former elementary schools:

- Hakusan (白山小学校) - Closed March 31, 2009 (Heisei 21)
- Ozenji (王禅寺小学校) - Closed March 31, 2009 (Heisei 21)

==== Kawasaki-ku ====
Municipal elementary schools:

- Asada (浅田小学校)
- Asahicho (旭町小学校)
- Daishi (大師小学校)
- Fujisaki (藤崎小学校)
- Higashi Monzen (東門前小学校)
- Higashi Oda (東小田小学校)
- Higashi Oshima (東大島小学校)
- Kawanakajima (川中島小学校)
- Kawasaki (川崎小学校)
- Kyomachi (京町小学校)
- Miyamae (宮前小学校)
- Mukai (向小学校)
- Oda (小田小学校)
- Oshima (大島小学校)
- Sakura (さくら小学校)
- Shincho (新町小学校)
- Tajima (田島小学校)
- Tonomachi (殿町小学校)
- Watarida (渡田小学校)
- Yotsuya (四谷小学校)

Former elementary schools:

- Higashi Sakuramoto (東桜本小学校) - Closed on March 31, 2010 (Heisei 22)
- Sakuramoto (桜本小学校) - Closed on March 31, 2010 (Heisei 22)

==== Miyamae-ku ====
- Arima (有馬小学校)
- Fujimidai (富士見台小学校)
- Hiebara (稗原小学校)
- Inukura (犬蔵小学校)
- Minami Nogawa (南野川小学校)
- Miyamaedaira (宮前平小学校)
- Miyazaki (宮崎小学校)
- Miyazakidai (宮崎台小学校)
- Mukaigaoka (向丘小学校)
- Nishi Arima (西有馬小学校)
- Nishi Nogawa (西野川小学校)
- Nogawa (野川小学校)
- Saginuma (鷺沼小学校)
- Shirahatadai (白幡台小学校)
- Sugao (菅生小学校)
- Taira (平小学校)
- Tsuchihashi (土橋小学校)

==== Nakahara-ku ====
- Gyokusen (玉川小学校)
- Higashi Sumiyoshi (東住吉小学校)
- Hirama (平間小学校)
- Ida (井田小学校)
- Imai (今井小学校)
- Kami Maruko (上丸子小学校)
- Kariyado (苅宿小学校)
- Kizuki (木月小学校)
- Kosugi (小杉小学校)
- Miyauchi (宮内小学校)
- Nakahara (中原小学校)
- Nishi Maruko (西丸子小学校)
- Ogayato (大谷戸小学校)
- Oto (大戸小学校)
- Shimogawara (下河原小学校)
- Shimokodanaka (下小田中小学校)
- Shimonumabe (下沼部小学校)
- Shinjo (新城小学校)
- Sumiyoshi (住吉小学校)

==== Saiwai-ku ====
- Furuichiba (古市場小学校)
- Furukawa (古川小学校)
- Higashi Ogura (東小倉小学校)
- Hiyoshi (日吉小学校)
- Minamigawara (南河原小学校)
- Minamikase (南加瀬小学校)
- Miyuki (御幸小学校)
- Nishi Miyuki (西御幸小学校)
- Ogura (小倉小学校)
- Saiwaicho (幸町小学校)
- Shimo Hirama (下平間小学校)
- Tode (戸手小学校)
- Yumemigasaki (夢見ヶ崎小学校)

Former elementary schools:

- Kawaramachi (河原町小学校) - Closed on March 31, 2006 (Heisei 18)

==== Takatsu-ku ====
- Higashi Takatsu (東高津小学校)
- Hisamoto (久本小学校)
- Hisasue (久末小学校)
- Kajigaya (梶ヶ谷小学校)
- Kamisakunobe (上作延小学校)
- Kuji (久地小学校)
- Minamihara (南原小学校)
- Nishi Kajigaya (西梶ヶ谷小学校)
- Sakado (坂戸小学校)
- Shibokuchi (子母口小学校)
- Shimosakunobe (下作延小学校)
- Shinsaku (新作小学校)
- Suenaga (末長小学校)
- Tachibana (橘小学校)
- Takatsu (高津小学校)

==== Tama-ku ====
- Higashi Ikuta (東生田小学校)
- Higashi Suge (東菅小学校)
- Ikuta (生田小学校)
- Inada (稲田小学校)
- Minami Ikuta (南生田小学校)
- Minami Suge (南菅小学校)
- Mita (三田小学校)
- Nagao (長尾小学校)
- Nakanoshima (中野島小学校)
- Nishi Suge (西菅小学校)
- Noborito (登戸小学校)
- Shimofuda (下布田小学校)
- Shukugawara (宿河原小学校)
- Suge (菅小学校)

=== Sagamihara ===
Chuo-ku

- Aoba (青葉小学校)
- Chuo (中央小学校)
- Fuchinobe (淵野辺小学校)
- Fuchinobe Higashi (淵野辺東小学校)
- Fujimi (富士見小学校)
- Hikarigaoka (光が丘小学校)
- Hoshigaoka (星が丘小学校)
- Kamimizo (上溝小学校)
- Kamimizo Minami (上溝南小学校)
- Koyo (向陽小学校)
- Kyowa (共和小学校)
- Namiki (並木小学校)
- Ono Kita (大野北小学校)
- Oyama (小山小学校)
- Seishin (清新小学校)
- Shinjuku (新宿小学校)
- Tana (田名小学校)
- Tana Kita (田名北小学校)
- Yaei (弥栄小学校)
- Yokodai (陽光台小学校)
- Yokoyama (横山小学校)

Midori-ku

- Aihara (相原小学校)
- Asahi (旭小学校)
- Chigira (千木良小学校)
- Fujino (藤野小学校)
- Fujino Kita (藤野北小学校)
- Fujino Minami (藤野南小学校)
- Hashimoto (橋本小学校)
- Hirota (広田小学校)
- Kawashiri (川尻小学校)
- Keihoku (桂北小学校)
- Koryo (広陵小学校)
- Kushikawa (串川小学校)
- Kuzawa (九沢小学校)
- Miyakami (宮上小学校)
- Nakano (中野小学校)
- Negoya (根小屋小学校)
- Nihonmatsu (二本松小学校)
- Osawa (大沢小学校)
- Otori (大島小学校)
- Sakunoguchi (作の口小学校)
- Shonan (湘南小学校)
- Taimada (当麻田小学校)
- Toya (鳥屋小学校)
- Tsukui Chuo (津久井中央小学校)
- Uchigo (内郷小学校)

Minami-ku

- Araiso (新磯小学校)
- Asamizo (麻溝小学校)
- Futaba (双葉小学校)
- Kami Tsuruma (上鶴間小学校)
- Kashimadai (鹿島台小学校)
- Kunugidai (くぬぎ台小学校)
- Midoridai (緑台小学校)
- Minami Ono (南大野小学校)
- Moegidai (もえぎ台小学校)
- Ono (大野小学校)
- Onodai (大野台小学校)
- Onodai Chuo (大野台中央小学校)
- Onuma (大沼小学校)
- Sagamidai (相模台小学校)
- Sakuradai (桜台小学校)
- Sobudai (相武台小学校)
- Torin (東林小学校)
- Tsurunodai (鶴の台小学校)
- Tsuruzono (鶴園小学校)
- Wakakusa (若草小学校)
- Wakamatsu (若松小学校)
- Yaguchi (谷口小学校)
- Yaguchidai (谷口台小学校)
- Yumenooka (夢の丘小学校)

== Foreign government-operated ==
Department of Defense Education Activity (DoDEA), United States:

- John O. Arnn Elementary School - Sagamihara DHA Building, Sagamihara Housing Area, Camp Zama
- Ikego Elementary School - United States Fleet Activities Yokosuka
- Sullivans Elementary School - United States Fleet Activities Yokosuka

== Private ==
- German School of Tokyo Yokohama (elementary division)
- Yokohama International School
- Yokohama Overseas Chinese School
- Yokohama Yamate Chinese School
- Yokohama Korean Primary School (横浜朝鮮初級学校)
- Kawasaki Korean Primary School (川崎朝鮮初級学校)
- Nambu Korean Primary School (南武朝鮮初級学校).
- Tsurumi Korean Primary School (鶴見朝鮮初級学校) - North Korean international school - Kindergarten and primary school
- Horizon Japan International School

== See also ==
- Lists of schools in Japan
- List of junior high schools in Kanagawa Prefecture
