= Marist Brothers International School =

Coordinates: 34°38′40.74″N 135°6′50.85″E

- マリスト国際学校

Location
- 1-2-1 Chimori-cho, Suma-ku, Kobe 654-0072; Kobe, Hyōgo Prefecture; Japan

Information
- Type: Private, co-educational international school
- Motto: Sapientia et Virtus
- Established: 1951
- Enrollment: Approx. 520 (2026)
- Colors: Maroon and Gold
- Mascot: Bulldog
- Accreditation: Western Association of Schools and Colleges (WASC)
- Website: www.marist.ac.jp

Marist Brothers International School (MBIS) is a private, co-educational international school in Kobe, Japan. Founded in 1951, the school serves students from Early Years (age 3) through Grade 12. It is an International Baccalaureate (IB) World School offering the Primary Years Programme (PYP), Middle Years Programme (MYP), and Diploma Programme (DP).

The school is accredited by the Western Association of Schools and Colleges (WASC).

As of 2026, MBIS enrolls approximately 520 students representing more than 35 nationalities.

== History ==
Marist Brothers International School was established in 1951 in Kobe. The school was originally founded by members of the Marist Brothers, an international educational organization established in France in 1817.

== Academics ==
MBIS follows the International Baccalaureate continuum:

- Primary Years Programme (PYP) – Early Years to Grade 5
- Middle Years Programme (MYP) – Grades 6 to 10
- Diploma Programme (DP) – Grades 11 and 12

English is the primary language of instruction. The school offers English as an Additional Language (EAL) support and Japanese language programs for both native and non-native speakers.

== Student body ==
The student body is internationally diverse, with students representing over 35 countries.

== Athletics ==
The school's teams, known as the Bulldogs, compete in sports such as soccer, basketball, volleyball, baseball, and softball. MBIS participates in interscholastic competitions with other international schools in Japan, including tournaments organized by the Western Japan Activities Association (WJAA).

== Model United Nations ==
MBIS hosts an annual Model United Nations (MUN) conference, established in 1986-the longest running MUN conference in Japan. The conference brings together students from international schools across Japan and abroad to debate global issues and draft resolutions.

== See also ==
- Education in Kobe
- List of international schools in Japan
