= Horizon Japan International School =

Coordinates: 35°30′9.7″N 139°39′13.5″E

- ホライゾンジャパンインターナショナルスクール
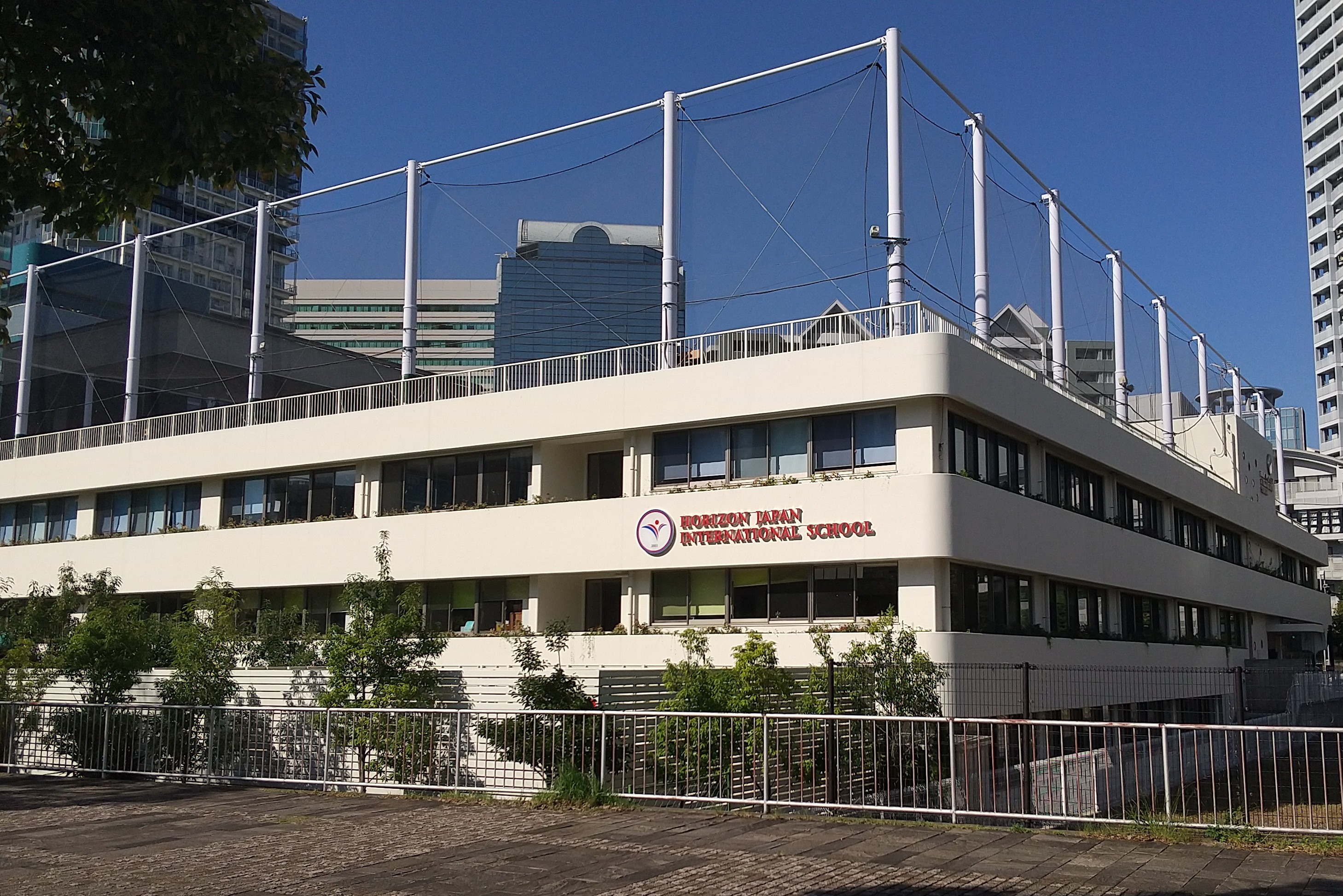

Location
- 1-24 Ono-cho, Kanagawa-ku, Yokohama-shi, Kanagawa 221-0055; Yokohama, Kanagawa Prefecture; Japan

Information
- Type: Private not-for-profit international school
- Motto: A Community of Lifelong Learners
- Established: 2003
- Head teacher: Mehmet Deniz
- Grades: Preschool–Grade 12
- Gender: Co-educational
- Age range: 3–18
- Enrollment: over 500
- Language: English
- Colours: Red and blue
- Mascot: Horizon Hawks
- Website: www.horizon.ac.jp

Horizon Japan International School (ホライゾンジャパンインターナショナルスクール), commonly abbreviated as HJIS, is a private not-for-profit co-educational international school located in Kanagawa-ku, Yokohama, Kanagawa Prefecture, Japan. Established in 2003, the school serves students from preschool through Grade 12.

HJIS is an International Baccalaureate World School authorized to offer the Primary Years Programme (PYP), Middle Years Programme (MYP), and Diploma Programme (DP). The school has over 500 students representing more than 50 nationalities.

== History ==
Horizon Japan International School was established in Yokohama in 2003. The school is recognized as a Gakkō Hōjin educational corporation by Kanagawa Prefecture.

HJIS became an IB World School for the Diploma Programme on 17 June 2013. The school was later authorized to offer the Middle Years Programme on 8 July 2021 and the Primary Years Programme on 22 July 2021, making it an IB Continuum school.

The school's current campus in Kanagawa-ku, Yokohama, was completed in 2019.

== Campus ==
HJIS is located at 1-24 Ono-cho, Kanagawa-ku, Yokohama-shi, Kanagawa, near Yokohama Station and other transport links. The campus, completed in 2019, was designed with flexible learning spaces and includes classrooms, science laboratories, creative studios, athletic spaces, and a rooftop sports area known as "The Nest".

== Accreditation and affiliations ==
HJIS is an IB World School authorized to offer the Primary Years Programme, Middle Years Programme, and Diploma Programme.

The school is accredited by the Western Association of Schools and Colleges (WASC). HJIS is also accredited by the Council of International Schools (CIS); CIS announced that Horizon Japan International School received CIS accreditation on 16 February 2023.

The school is affiliated with or a member of several educational organizations, including the European Council of International Schools (ECIS), the Japan Council of International Schools (JCIS), and the Tokyo Association of International Preschools (TAIP).

HJIS has been recognized as a Gakkō Hōjin educational corporation by Kanagawa Prefecture since 2004.

== Curriculum ==
HJIS offers an international education from preschool through Grade 12. The school follows the IB framework and implements the US Common Core.

Programme	Grade levels	Notes
IB Primary Years Programme (PYP)	Preschool–Grade 5	Includes early learning and primary years
IB Middle Years Programme (MYP)	Grades 6–10	Includes the MYP Personal Project
IB Diploma Programme (DP)	Grades 11–12	University-preparatory diploma programme

The language of instruction for the school's IB programmes is English.

== Students ==
HJIS has over 500 students representing more than 50 nationalities. The school serves families in Yokohama, Kanagawa, Tokyo, and the surrounding international community.

== Athletics ==
HJIS fields student teams in sports including futsal, basketball, volleyball, and badminton. Its teams participate in ISTAA League and related competitions.

The school mascot is the Hawks.

== See also ==
- List of international schools in Japan
- List of junior high schools in Kanagawa Prefecture
- List of elementary schools in Kanagawa Prefecture
