= Kanagawa Korean Jr./ Sr. High School =

North Korea-affiliated school in Japan

Kanagawa Korean Junior and Senior High School
- 神奈川朝鮮中高級学校 가나가와조선중고급학교

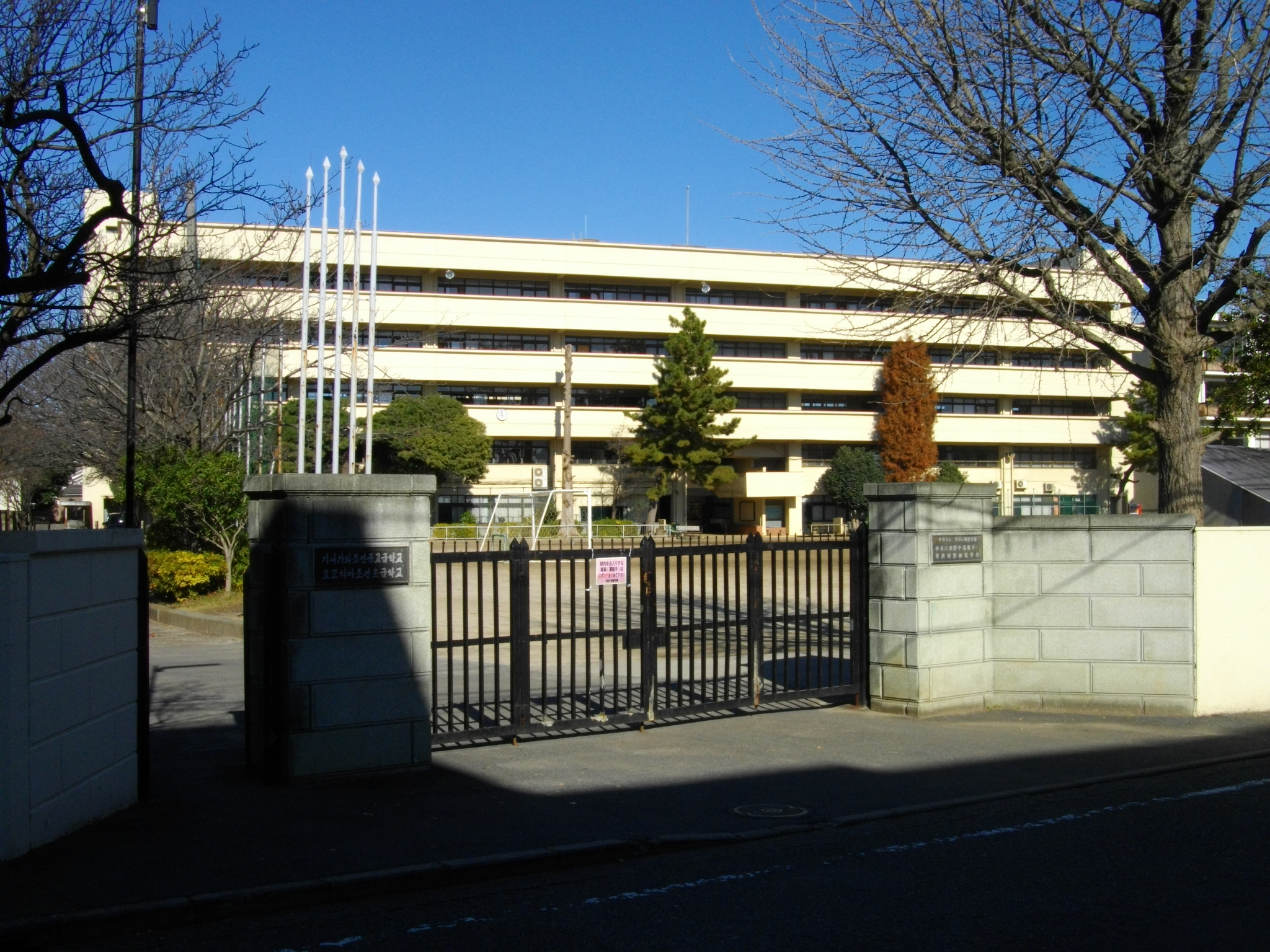
- The school building in 2014

Location
- 21 Sawatari, Kanagawa-ku; Kanagawa Prefecture; Yokohama, 221-0844; Japan; 35.4719°N 139.6158°E

Information
- Type: Private Korean international school
- Established: 1951; 75 years ago
- School board: Kanagawa Korean Educational Foundation
- Principal: 金燦旭
- Grades: Junior and senior high school

Kanagawa Korean Jr./ Sr. High School or Kanagawa Korean Middle and High School (神奈川朝鮮中高級学校, Kanagawa Chōsen Chūkōkyūgakkō; 가나가와조선중고급학교) is a North Korean international school in Kanagawa-ku, Yokohama, Kanagawa, Japan.

== See also ==
- List of junior high schools in Kanagawa Prefecture
