= German School of Tokyo Yokohama =

- Deutsche Schule Tokyo Yokohama 東京横浜独逸学園
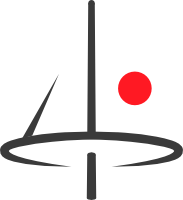

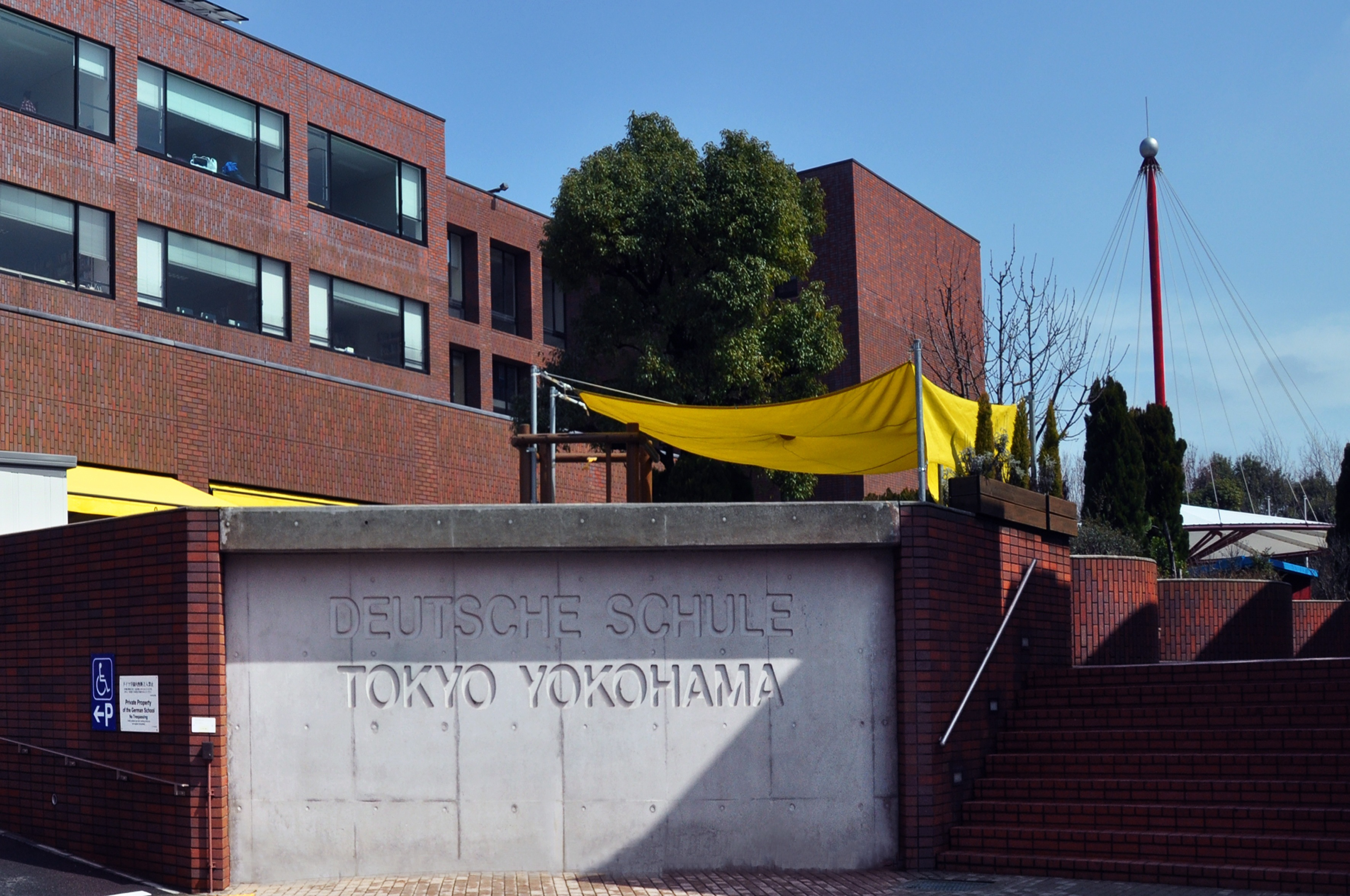
- School entrance

Location
- 2-4-1 Chigasaki-Minami, Tsuzuki-ku 〒224-0037 横浜市都筑区茅ヶ崎南2-4-1; Yokohama, Kanagawa Prefecture, 224-0037; Japan; 35.53859°N 139.58158°E

Information
- Other names: DSTY
- Type: Private, co-educational
- Motto: German: Bildung, die verbindet (Education that connects)
- Established: 20 September 1904
- Principal: Thorsten Knab
- Grades: Kindergarten - 12th grade
- Language: German
- Website: dsty.ac.jp

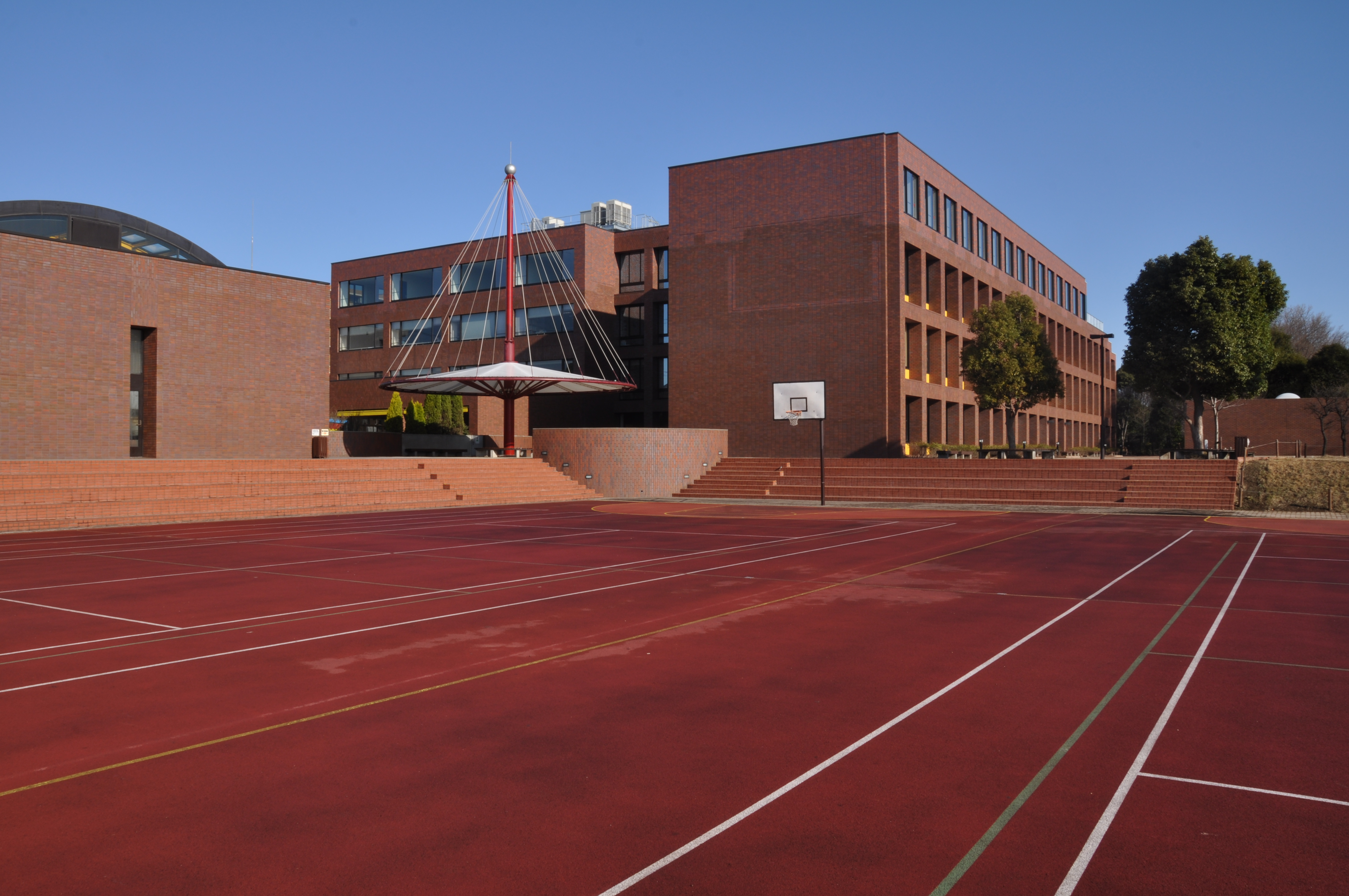
Exterior view

The German School of Tokyo Yokohama, Japanese: 東京横浜独逸学園, romanized: Tōkyō Yokohama Doitsu Gakuen, German: Deutsche Schule Tokyo Yokohama, DSTY is an officially approved German school in Tsuzuki-ku, Yokohama, Japan. It is the oldest German school in East Asia still in existence today.

== Overview ==
The school includes a kindergarten, a primary school, a middle school (Orientierungsstufe) and a secondary school, which ends with the Abitur graduation exam with the option to enter the university. Other possible graduations are available excluding the possibility to go to university. These are the technical secondary school certificate (Fachoberschulabschluss), the secondary school certificate (Realschulabschluss) and the secondary modern school qualification (Hauptschulabschluss). Classes are held in German. For foreign languages English, Japanese, French, Latin and Spanish (as a school club) are available.

The closest subway station is Nakamachidai Station (10 minutes by foot).

== History ==
The German School of Tokyo Yokohama was established in 1904 in Yokohama. After the 1923 Great Kantō earthquake many German families moved from Yokohama to Tokyo. The school opened its new building in Ōmori, Ōta, Tokyo, in 1934. The building suffered little damage during World War II, but was requisitioned by the American military government as enemy property following Germany's capitulation in May 1945, so school activity came to a standstill. American authorities returned the school's impounded property in 1951 and school activity finally could restart on December 1, 1953, with 17 students in total. In 1960 the first graduation students received their certificates.

At the time the school campus was in Ota, Tokyo. On November 27, 1967, the school's old building was replaced with a modern structure. After 1970 the student numbers rose quickly and the school outgrew its space. It was decided to build a new, more spacious school building in Tsuzuki-ku, Yokohama. The school's activities started there in September 1991 with 450 students. After a temporary slump in the number of schoolchildren, the enrollment numbers rose significantly, requiring the addition of a third floor to the 1991 building in 2010. The school survived the triple disaster of 2011 without any structural damage, but the number of students initially fell sharply due to the departure of many families. Today the effects of the crisis can no longer be seen, with over 550 students now attending the school.

== See also ==
- List of high schools in Tokyo
- List of junior high schools in Kanagawa Prefecture
- List of elementary schools in Kanagawa Prefecture

German schools in Japan:

- Deutsche Schule Kobe/European School

Japanese international schools in Germany:

- Japanische Internationale Schule zu Berlin
- Japanische Internationale Schule in Düsseldorf
- Japanische Internationale Schule Frankfurt
- Japanische Schule in Hamburg
- Japanische Internationale Schule München
- Toin Gakuen Schule Deutschland (closed)
