= Pat Barr (writer) =

English novelist (1934–2018)

- Born: Patricia Miriam Copping; 25 April 1934; Norwich, United Kingdom
- Died: 20 March 2018 (aged 83)
- Occupations: writer, novelist, social historian, journalist

Pat Barr (25 April 1934 – 20 March 2018) was an English novelist, writer of social history and journalist. She was born in Norwich, attended Norwich High School for Girls and studied English at the University of Birmingham. She worked as a teacher at Yokohama International School in Japan. She also studied for a master's degree from University College London.

== Career ==
In the 1960s Barr was Assistant Secretary of the National Old People's Welfare Council. In this role she wrote The Elderly: Handbook on Care and Services (1968), and edited a book of older people's memories of their childhoods, I Remember: An Arrangement for Many Voices (1970).

Her non-fiction books include:

- The Coming of the Barbarians: A Story of Western Settlement in Japan, 1853-1870 (1967)
- The Deer Cry Pavilion: A Story of Westerners in Japan, 1868–1905 (1988)
- A Curious Life for a Lady: The Story of Isabella Bird, A Remarkable Victorian Traveller (1970)
- Foreign Devils: Westerners in the Far East, the Sixteenth Century to the Present Day (1970)
- To China With Love: The Lives and Times of Protestant Missionaries in China 1860-1900 (1972)
- The Memsahibs: The Women of Victorian India (1976)
- Taming the Jungle: The Men Who Made British Malaya (1977)
- Simla: A Hill Station in British India (1978) (co-authored with Ray Desmond)
- Japan (1980)
- The Dust in the Balance: British Women in India, 1905-1945 (1989)

Her first novel, written jointly with her husband John Barr under the pen name Laurence Hazard, was The Andean Murders (1960).

Her other novels include:

- Chinese Alice (1981)
- Uncut Jade (1982); Chinese Alice and Uncut Jade were published as one book, Jade, in 1984
- Kenjiro. A Novel of Nineteenth-Century Japan (1985)
- Coromandel (1988)

Four of her novels were bestsellers.

Barr was active as a feminist and as a member of the Women in Media group. She contributed a chapter, "Newspapers", to Is This Your Life?: Images of Women in the Media (1977), and wrote The Framing of the Female (1978). She also wrote for the feminist magazine Spare Rib.

Barr died in Norwich in 2018.
