= List of junior high schools in Kanagawa Prefecture =

This is a list of junior high schools in Kanagawa Prefecture.

== Municipal ==
=== Yokohama ===
==== Aoba-ku ====
- Akanedai (あかね台)
- Aobadai (青葉台)
- Azamino (あざみ野)
- Ichigao (市ケ尾)
- Kamoshida (鴨志田)
- Midorigaoka (緑が丘)
- Mitakedai (みたけ台)
- Moegino (もえぎ野)
- Nara (奈良)
- Susukino (すすき野)
- Utsukushigaoka (美しが丘)
- Yamauchi (山内)
- Yamoto (谷本)

==== Asahi-ku ====
- Asahi (旭)
- Asahi-Kita (旭北)
- Honjuku (本宿)
- Imajuku (今宿)
- Kami-shirane (上白根)
- Kibōgaoka (希望が丘)
- Makigahara (万騎が原)
- Minami-Kibōgaoka (南希望が丘)
- Sakon-yama (左近山)
- Tsuoka (都岡)
- Tsurugamine (鶴ケ峯)
- Wakabadai (若葉台)

==== Hodogaya-ku ====
- Arai (新井)
- Hodogaya (保土ケ谷)
- Iwaihara (岩井原)
- Iwasaki (岩崎)
- Kamisugeta (上菅田)
- Miyata (宮田)
- Nishiya (西谷)
- Tachibana (橘)

==== Isogo-ku ====
- Hama (浜)
- Mori (森)
- Negishi (根岸)
- Okamura (岡村)
- Shiomidai (汐見台)
- Yōkōdai-Dai-ichi (No. 1) (洋光台第一)
- Yōkōdai-Daini (No. 2) (洋光台第二)

==== Izumi-ku ====
Combined elementary and junior high schools:

- Ryokuen Gakuen (緑園学園)

Junior high schools:

- Izumigaoka (泉が丘)
- Izumino (いずみ野)
- Kami-Iida (上飯田)
- Nakada (中田)
- Nakawada (中和田)
- Okazu (岡津)
- Ryoke (領家)

==== Kanagawa-ku ====
- Kanagawa (神奈川)
- Kuritaya (栗田谷)
- Matsumoto (松本)
- Nishikidai (錦台)
- Rokkakubashi (六角橋)
- Sugeta (菅田)
- Urashimaoka (浦島丘)

==== Kanazawa-ku ====
Nishi Kanazawa Elementary/Junior High School a.k.a. Nishi Kanazawa Gakuen (西金沢学園) is a combined elementary and junior high school in Kanazawa-ku.

Junior high schools:

- Daido (大道)
- Kamariya (釜利谷)
- Kanasawa (金沢)
- Koda (小田)
- Mutsuura (六浦)
- Namiki (並木)
- Nishishiba (西柴)
- Tomioka (富岡)
- Tomioka Higashi (富岡東)

==== Kohoku-ku ====
- Hiyoshidai (日吉台)
- Hiyoshidai Nishi (日吉台西)
- Nitta (新田)
- Nippa (新羽)
- Otsuna (大綱)
- Shinohara (篠原)
- Shirosato (城郷)
- Takata (高田)
- Tarumachi (樽町)

==== Konan-ku ====
- Higashinagaya (東永谷)
- Higiriyama (日限山)
- Hino-minami (日野南)
- Kaminagaya (上永谷)
- Kōnan (港南)
- Kōnandai-Dai-ichi (No. 1) (港南台第一)
- Maruyamadai (丸山台)
- Sasage (笹下)
- Serigaya (芹が谷)
- JHS Attached to Minami HS (南高等学校附属)

Former junior high schools:

- Noba (野庭) - Closed in 2020.

==== Midori-ku ====
There is a combined elementary and junior high school, Kirigaoka Gakuen (霧が丘学園).

Junior high schools:

- Higashi Kamoi (東鴨居)
- Kamoi (鴨居)
- Nakayama (中山)
- Tana (田奈)
- Tokaichiba (十日市場)

==== Minami-ku ====
- Fujinoki (藤の木)
- Heiraku (平楽)
- Kyoshin (共進)
- Maita (蒔田)
- Minami (南)
- Minamigaoka (南が丘)
- Mutsukawa (六ツ川)
- Nagata (永田)

==== Naka-ku ====
- Honmoku (本牧)
- Minato (港)
- Nakaodai (仲尾台)
- Otori (大鳥)
- Yokohama Yoshida (横浜吉田)

==== Nishi-ku ====
- Karuizawa (軽井沢)
- Nishi (西)
- Oimatsu (老松)
- Okano (岡野)

==== Sakae-ku ====
- Hongō (本郷)
- Iijima (飯島)
- Kamigō (上郷)
- Katsuradai (桂台)
- Koyamadai (小山台)
- Nishihongō (西本郷)

==== Seya-ku ====
- Azumano (東野)
- Hara (原)
- Minami-seya (南瀬谷)
- Seya (瀬谷)
- Shimoseya (下瀬谷)

==== Totsuka-ku ====
- Akiba (秋葉)
- Fukaya (深谷)
- Gumisawa (汲沢)
- Hirado (平戸)
- Maioka (舞岡)
- Minami-totsuka (南戸塚)
- Nase (名瀬)
- Sakaigi (境木)
- Taishō (大正)
- Totsuka (戸塚)
- Toyoda (豊田)

Additionally, Ryokuen Gakuen (緑園学園), a combined elementary and junior high school outside of Totsuka-ku, has an attendance zone including parts of Totsuka-ku.

==== Tsurumi-ku ====
- Kaminomiya (上の宮)
- Kansei (寛政)
- Ichiba (市場)
- Namamugi (生麦)
- Sueyoshi (末吉)
- Terao (寺尾)
- Tsurumi (鶴見)
- Ushioda (潮田)
- Yakou (矢向)
- Attached Junior High School of Yokohama Science Frontier High School

==== Tsuzuki-ku ====
- Chigasaki (茅ケ崎)
- Edaminami (荏田南)
- Hayabuchi (早渕)
- Higashi-yamata (東山田)
- Kawawa (川和)
- Nakagawa (中川)
- Nakagawa-nishi (中川西)
- Tsuda (都田)

=== Kawasaki ===
==== Asao-ku ====
- Asao (麻生中学校)
- Haruhino (はるひ野中学校)
- Kakio (柿生中学校)
- Kanahodo (金程中学校)
- Nagasawa (長沢中学校)
- Nishiikuta (西生田中学校)
- Ozenji Chuo (王禅寺中央中学校)
- Shiratori (白鳥中学校)

Former junior high schools:

- Hakusan (白山中学校) - Closed March 31, 2008 (Heisei 20)
- Ozenji (王禅寺中学校) - Closed March 31, 2008 (Heisei 20)

==== Kawasaki-ku ====
- Daishi (大師中学校)
- Fujimi (富士見中学校)
- Kawanakajima (川中島中学校)
- Kawasaki JHS (川崎中学校)
- Affiliated Junior High School of Kawasaki HS (川崎高等学校附属中学校)
- Kyomachi (京町中学校)
- Minami Daishi (南大師中学校)
- Rinko (臨港中学校)
- Sakuramoto (桜本中学校)
- Tajima (田島中学校)
- Watarida (渡田中学校)

==== Miyamae-ku ====
- Arima (有馬中学校)
- Inukura (犬蔵中学校)
- Miyamaedaira (宮前平中学校)
- Miyazaki (宮崎中学校)
- Mukaigaoka (向丘中学校)
- Nogawa (野川中学校)
- Sugao (菅生中学校)
- Taira (平中学校)

==== Nakahara-ku ====
- Gyokusen (玉川中学校)
- Hirama (平間中学校)
- Ida (井田中学校)
- Imai (今井中学校)
- Miyauchi (宮内中学校)
- Nakahara (中原中学校)
- Nishi Nakahara (西中原中学校)
- Sumiyoshi (住吉中学校)

==== Saiwai-ku ====
- Hiyoshi (日吉中学校)
- Minamigawara (南河原中学校)
- Minamikase (南加瀬中学校)
- Miyuki (御幸中学校)
- Tsukagoshi (塚越中学校)

==== Takatsu-ku ====
- Higashitakatsu (東高津中学校)
- Higashitachibana (東橘中学校)
- Nishitakatsu (西高津中学校)
- Tachibana (橘中学校)
- Takatsu (高津中学校)

==== Tama-ku ====
- Ikuta (生田中学校)
- Inada (稲田中学校)
- Masugata (枡形中学校)
- Minamiikuta (南生田中学校)
- Minamisuge (南菅中学校)
- Nakanoshima (中野島中学校)
- Suge (菅中学校)

==== Ebina ====
- Arima (有馬中学校)
- Ebina (海老名中学校)
- Imaizumi (今泉中学校)
- Kaisei (海西中学校)
- Kashiwagaya (柏ケ谷中学校)
- Oya (大谷中学校)

=== Sagamihara ===
Chuo-ku

- Chuo (中央中学校)
- Kamimizo (上溝中学校)
- Kamimizo Minami (上溝南中学校)
- Kyowa (共和中学校)
- Midorigaoka (緑が丘中学校)
- Ono Kita (大野北中学校)
- Oyama (小山中学校)
- Seishin (清新中学校)
- Tana (田名中学校)
- Yaei (弥栄中学校)
- Yoshinodai (由野台中学校)

Midori-ku

- Aihara (相原中学校)
- Asahi (旭中学校)
- Fujino (藤野中学校)
- Hokuso (北相中学校)
- Kushikawa (串川中学校)
- Nakazawa (中沢中学校)
- Nakano (中野中学校)
- Osawa (大沢中学校)
- Sagamigaoka (相模丘中学校)
- Toya (鳥屋中学校)
- Uchide (内出中学校)
- Uchigo (内郷中学校)

Minami-ku

- Asamizodai (麻溝台中学校)
- Kami Tsuruma (上鶴間中学校)
- Onodai (大野台中学校)
- Ono Minami (大野南中学校)
- Sagamidai (相模台中学校)
- Shincho (新町中学校)
- Sobudai (相武台中学校)
- Soyo (相陽中学校)
- Torin (東林中学校)
- Unomori (鵜野森中学校)
- Wakakusa (若草中学校)
- Yaguchi (谷口中学校)

== Foreign government-operated ==
Department of Defense Education Activity (DoDEA) (United States):

- Zama Middle High School - Camp Zama
- Yokosuka Middle School - United States Fleet Activities Yokosuka

== Private ==
- German School of Tokyo Yokohama (junior high division)
- Yokohama International School
- Yokohama Overseas Chinese School
- Yokohama Yamate Chinese School
- Kanagawa Korean Jr./ Sr. High School (神奈川朝鮮中高級学校)
- Horizon Japan International School
- Caritas Girls' Junior and Senior High School

== See also ==
- Lists of schools in Japan
- List of elementary schools in Kanagawa Prefecture
