= Toin Gakuen Schule Deutschland =

- ドイツ桐蔭学園
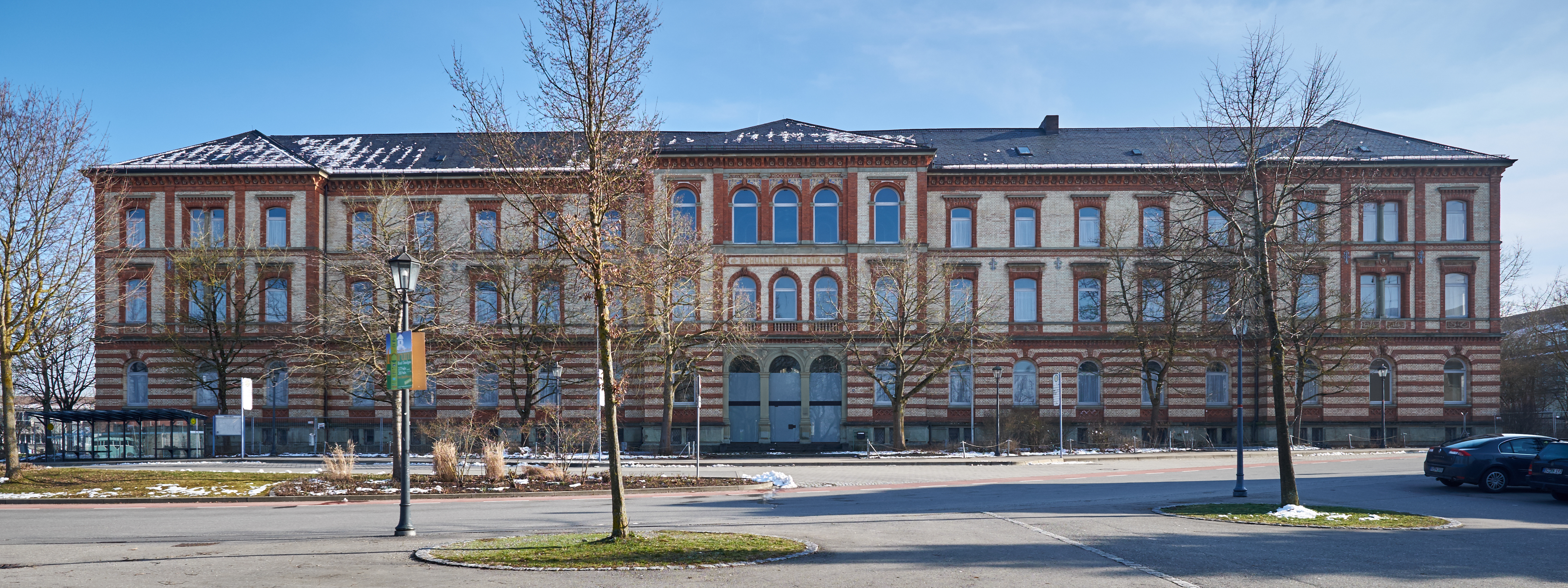
- Former main building of the school

Location
- Schuetzenstr. 26 D-88348 Bad Saulgau; Bad Saulgau; Germany
- Coordinates: 48.0192°N 9.5047°E

Information
- Type: Middle/high school
- Grades: 7-12
- Website: dtoin.de

Toin Gakuen Schule Deutschland (ドイツ桐蔭学園 Doitsu Tōin Gakuen) was a Japanese international school in Bad Saulgau, Baden-Württemberg, Germany. It opened in 1992 since many Japanese company employees assigned to work in Germany wanted their children to be prepared for the Japanese school system when they return to Japan. The school had both junior and senior high school sections. Since it was an affiliate of Toin Gakuen (学校法人桐蔭学園), this school was an overseas branch of a Japanese private school, or a Shiritsu zaigai kyoiku shisetsu (私立在外教育施設). The school provided boarding facilities for its students.

In 1994 the school had 136 students, its peak enrollment. The student body declined, with one reason being the Great Recession, despite promotional activities in Europe. As of April 2010 there were 47 students, about one third of the 1994 number, with no 7th grade (first year of junior high school) students. In March 2010 the school announced that it will close by March 2012.

Since late 2023, the main building has been undergoing conversion and will be used as a state-owned boarding school from 2026 onwards. It is recognised as a centre of excellence in STEM subjects in Bad Saulgau (German: *MINT-Exzellenzgymnasiums Bad Saulgau*).

== See also ==
- Japanese people in Germany
- German international schools in Japan:
  - German School Tokyo Yokohama - in Yokohama, Japan
  - Deutsche Schule Kobe/European School
