= Laurus International School of Science Tokyo =

Laurus International School of Science is a co-ed pre-school, kindergarten, and international school based in Tokyo. It enrolls students from Japan and the international community in the Tokyo area, while its headquarters are based in Shiba. Laurus follows the Cambridge International curriculum with regards to science, art, music, and physical education (PE).

== History ==
Laurus International School was founded by Mami Hioki, and opened its first school in 2002 as Bilinga to provide instruction in English Kindergarten (K3). The school was initially created to offer a more global choice of education than is currently available through the national education system in Japan, which is often seen as lecture-based.

Bilinga then changed its name to Laurus International School of Science in 2015, and now has a Primary and Lower Secondary school in Shiba, Minato.

== Pre-school through to kindergarten ==
Laurus follows the model of a Japanese kindergarten, which are referred to as a Yochien in Japan. They provide education for students who are aged 3–6. Students go through 3 years of instruction as K1 (ages 3–4) K2 (ages 4–5) and K3 (ages 5–6). Japanese kindergartens follow educational aims, while preschools are predominantly daycare facilities, concerned with providing care for infants and toddlers.

In 2016, Laurus became a member of TAIP (Tokyo Association of Preschools).

== Elementary school ==
Laurus International School of Science is Tokyo's first STEM school.

Laurus International School of Science accepts students from its own K–3 classes as well as other schools both in Japan and abroad. It offers a robust interdisciplinary STEM program, where lessons include programming and frequent hands-on activities. The school is currentlyseeking accreditation with Cambridge International Examinations, which accredits over 10,000 schools in 160 countries. The school includes programming and ICT classes that complement the core Cambridge curriculum, including computer and keyboard skills.

The school hosts an annual science fair.

== Locations ==
Laurus International School has six primary educational centers in its Shirokanedai, Jiyugaoka, Takanawa, Aoyama, Tsukishima, Musashikosugi, and Musashishinjo locations – mostly in the Tokyo Metropolitan area.

== Curriculum ==
Laurus International School uses a combination of the Cambridge International Examinations curriculum, established English language textbooks, which are supplemented by curriculum that has been developed by in-house experts.

== See also ==
- Education in Japan § International education
- Kindergarten § Japan
