= KIU Academy =

Kyoto International University （KIU） Academy

Location
- Kyotanabe, Kyoto, Japan; Japan; 34°49′30″N 135°46′22″E

Information
- Type: Private
- Established: 1999
- President: Peter Blocksom
- Principal: Haroldo Simoes
- Staff: 10
- Faculty: 28
- Grades: 1st to 12th Grade
- Colors: Blue & White
- Mascot: Phoenix
- Accreditation: WASC & ACSI
- Website: KIU Academy Website

KIU Academy is an international, bilingual Christian school located in Kyōtanabe, Kyoto, Japan.

== Location ==
The campus is located in Kyotanabe City which is 30 minutes away from three major locations; Kyoto City, The Osaka-Kobe Metropolitan Area, and Nara City.

== History ==
KIU Academy was founded in 1999 by the parent organization Kyoto International University as a school to provide an international education in both English and Japanese to where the graduates would be bilingual and bi-cultural. Today there are around 240 students representing nearly 20 countries, and diverse faculty of over 20 teaching professionals from 8 different countries.

On March 25, 2011, KIU Academy was accredited by the Association of Christian Schools International (ACSI), an organization whose accreditation is recognized in Japan.

In 2022, the school was accredited by the Western Association of Schools and Colleges (WASC).
