= Samurai Museum Berlin =

Samurai museum in Berlin Mitte, Germany

Coordinates: 52.5269°N 13.3953°E

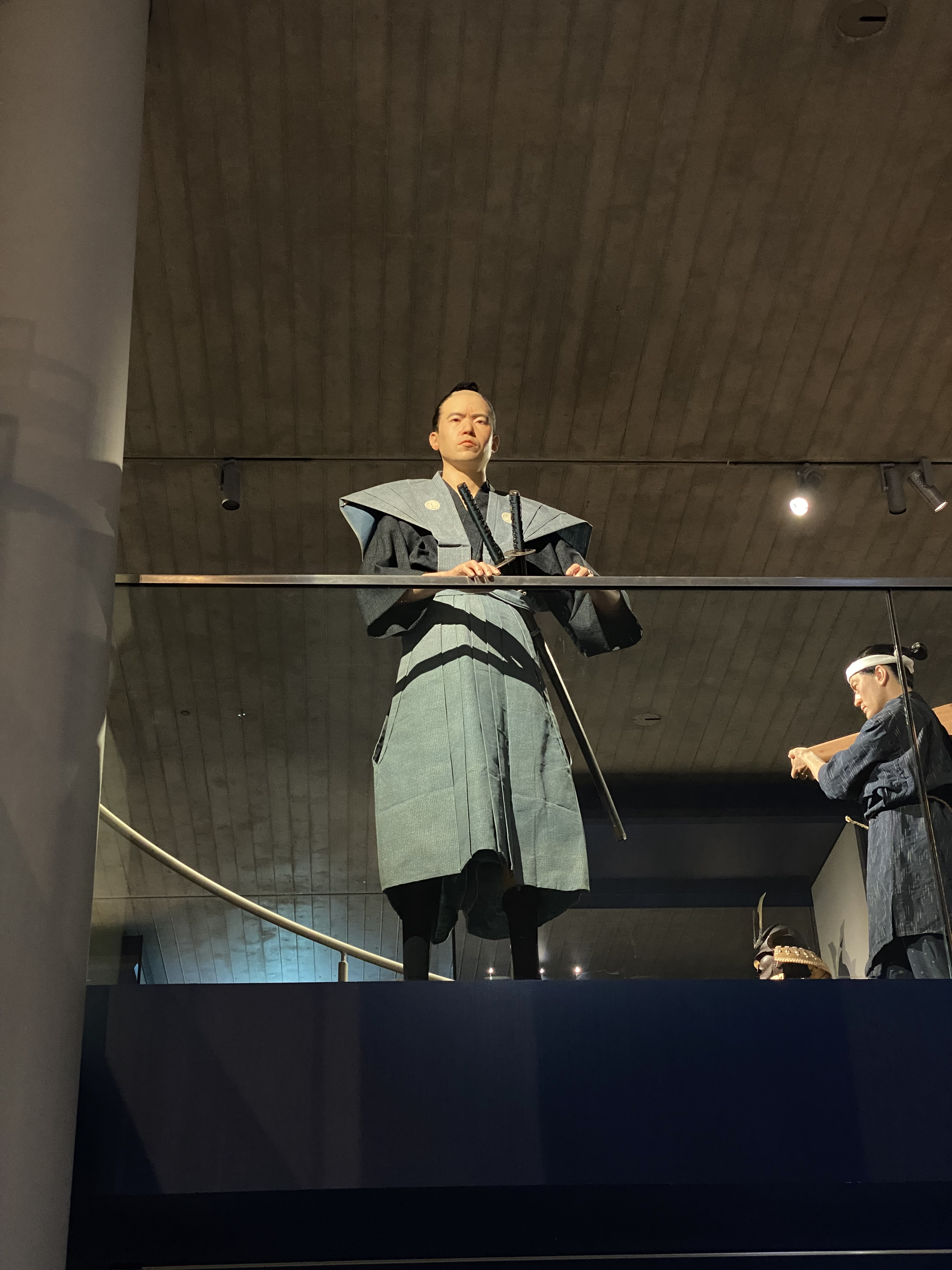
View from first to second floor inside Samurai Museum Berlin

The Samurai Museum Berlin is a private museum of artifacts and art objects of the Japanese samurai class, from the private collection of the builder Peter Janssen. It opened in 2022 and is located in the Mitte district of Berlin, Germany.

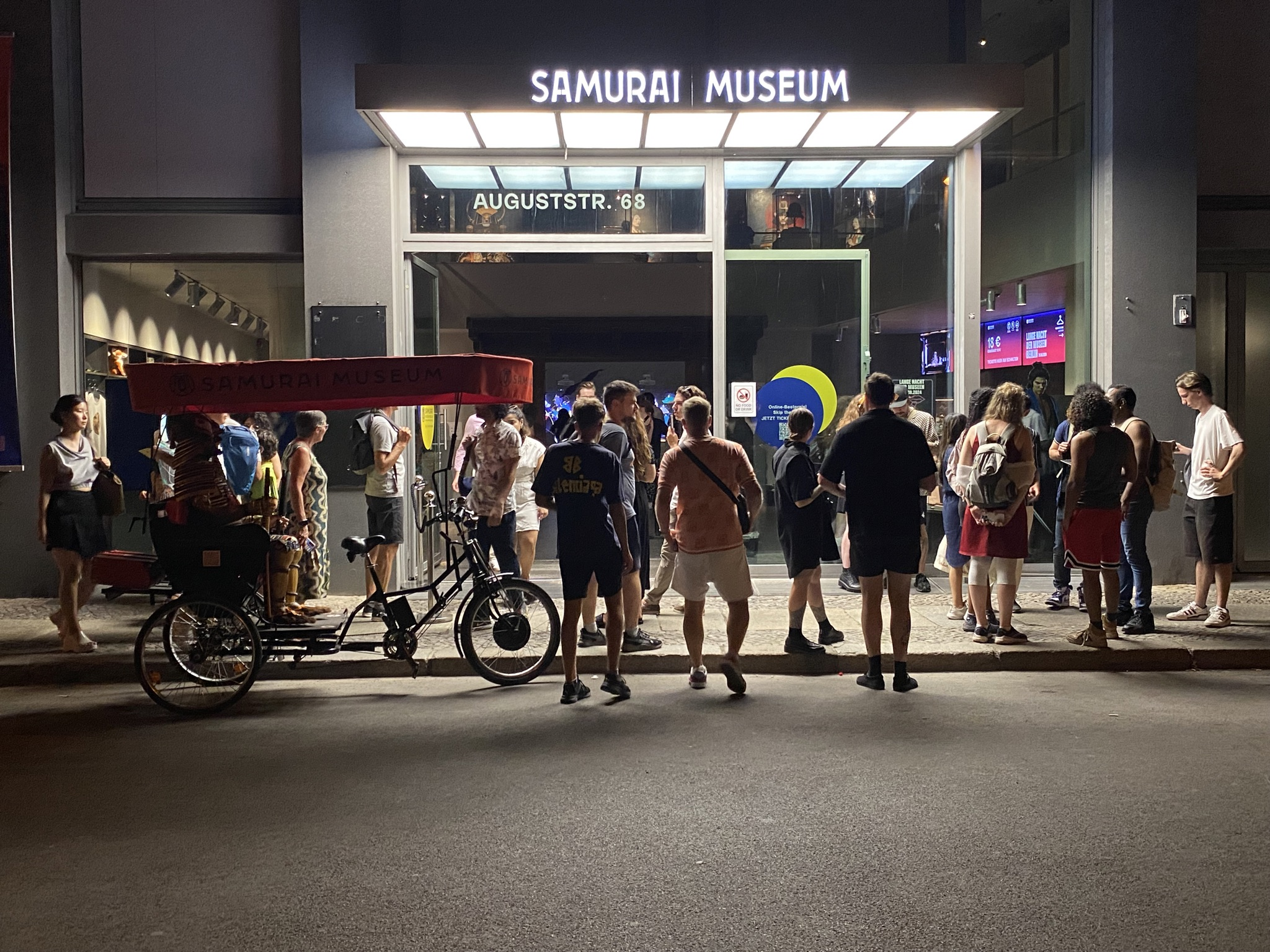
Samurai Museum Berlin

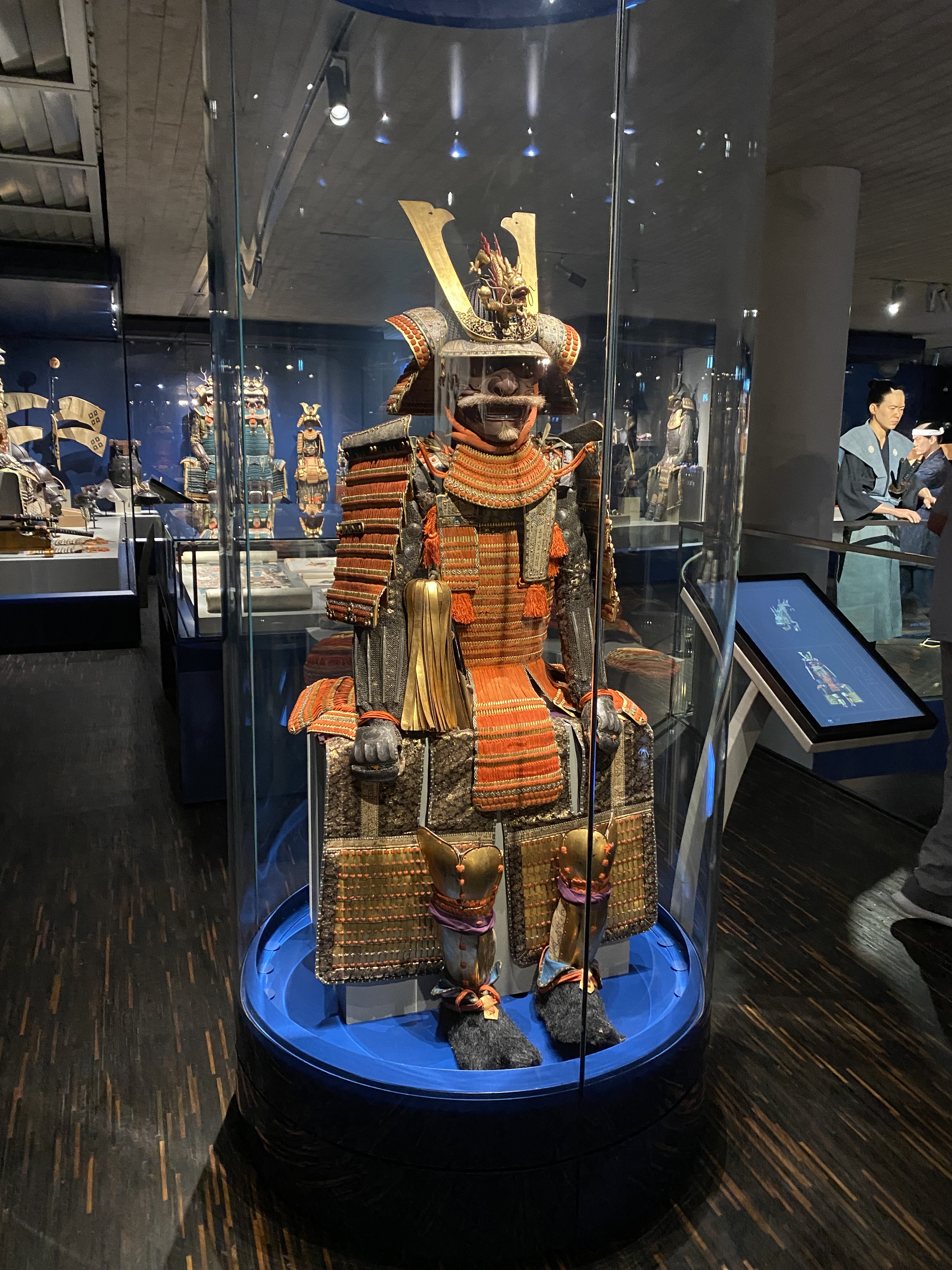
Samurai Suit of Armor, Samurai Museum Berlin

The only Samurai museum in Europe displays over 900 exhibits on 1500 square meters of exhibition space. The entire collection of the museum includes more than 4000 objects. Among them are about 40 complete suits of armor, 200 helmets, 150 masks, 160 swords, and numerous other evidences of samurai culture dating back nearly a millennium.

The oldest pieces in the collection date back to the Kofun period (300-538 AD). The majority of the objects date from the late Middle Ages and the early modern period (15th-18th centuries). Top pieces of the collection represent three samurai armors of the Kato clan from the Edo period (1603–1868). Another focus is on blades of famous master smiths of the Kamakura and Namboku-chō periods, which roughly corresponds to the European High Middle Ages (11th-14th centuries).

In addition to armor, helmets, masks, weapons, swords, and sword jewelry, the permanent exhibition also offers insights into wide-ranging areas of samurai culture, society, religion, and craftsmanship. These also include sculpture and painting, a lifelike Nō theater and Nō masks, and a freestanding teahouse with utensils used in the Japanese tea ceremony.

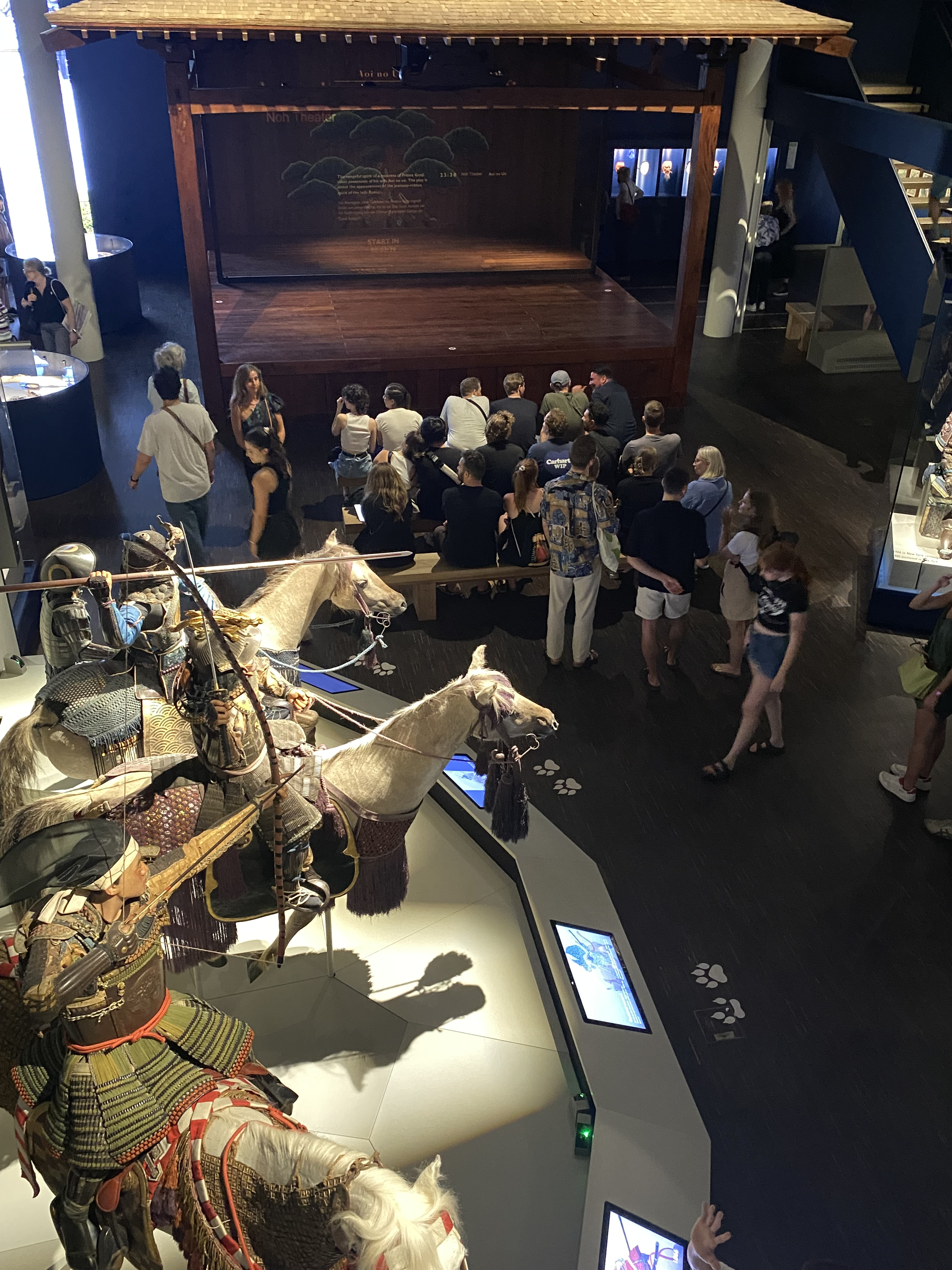
Insight into the exhibition, riders with horses

Through interactive installations and touchscreens attached to the exhibits, the exhibits are described in detail in either German or English. In parallel, a quiz available on the touch screens allows visitors to test or expand their own knowledge of samurai culture. The technology behind the interactive installations was designed by Ars Electronica Solutions.

“Peter Janssen presents the largest collection of authentic samurai artifacts outside of Japan in Berlin Mitte,” says Michael Mondria from Ars Electronica Solutions, referring to the museum's collection. “It was therefore important to prepare his collection for as wide an audience as possible.” Discovering and exploring the Samurai Museum is designed to be interactive and informative. Visitors can learn about the beliefs and philosophy of the samurai, as well as their everyday lives. “Our production interweaves the architecture of the museum with light, color and sounds,” says Mondria. “Embedded in this, we present the individual objects and talk about the people who created and used them.” There are stations that offer information and others that offer interaction. Other cultures and perspectives are also displayed.

Highlights of the exhibition

- An original historical Noh stage
- An original traditional tea house and collection of tea equipment
- One of the world's largest collections: Peter Janssen Collection
- The only Samurai Museum in Europe
- High-tech media installations
- The kitsune fox as a companion
- Ninja and Yōkai area
- These are the highlight objects you shouldn’t miss at the Museum

In addition to the permanent exhibition, temporary exhibitions are also held. Events, tea ceremonies, concerts and events are part of the exhibition program

== Literature ==
- Claudia Fährenkemper: Samurai, 2019
- Barbara Harding: The "Arts of Asia" Conversation with Peter Janssen of the Samurai Art Museum. In: Arts of Asia, July/August 2019: pp. 22–32.
- Eckhard Kremers: The Samurai Art Museum in Berlin. Interview with collector Peter Janssen. (Photographs by Manfred-Michael Sackmann) In: Ostasiatische Zeitschrift. New Series No. 35, Spring 2018.
- Andreas Platthaus: Samurai und Shamisen. The Peter Janssen Collection. In: FAZ - Frankfurter Allgemeine Zeitung
- Wird Berlins Samurai Museum „Europas bestes Museum“? Was dafür spricht. In Berliner Morgenpost
- Czas Samurajów, Time of the Samurai, Catalogue of the Exhibition, ISBN 978-83-68616-03-3, Lublin/ Poland, 2026
- Claire Léost, Pascale Socquet, GEO Historie Hors-Série: Samourais Guerriers du Japon et icones de la pop culture, Dez 22/Jan 23
