= Yokohama International School =

- 横浜インターナショナルスクール

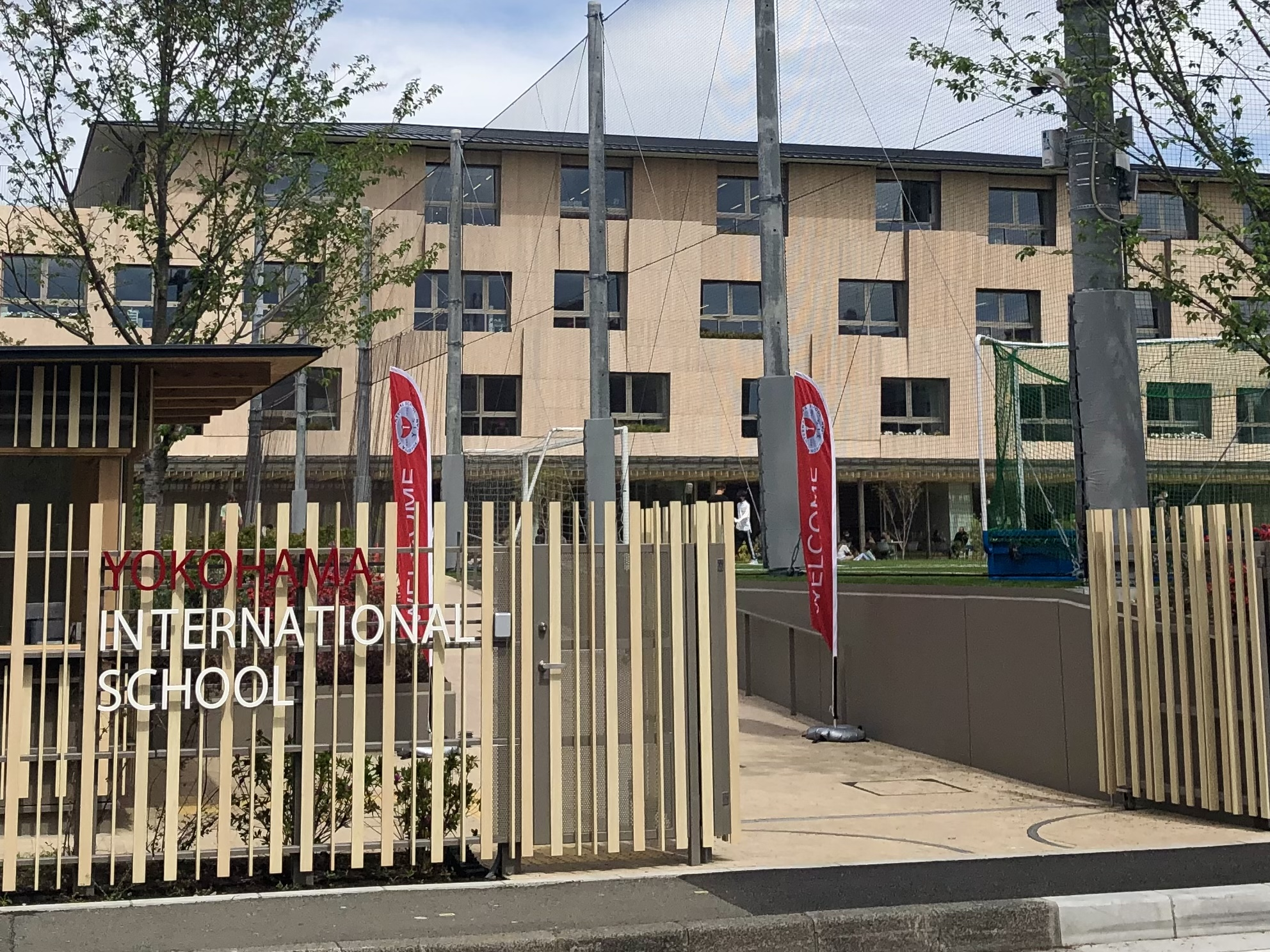

Location
- 2-100-1 Kominato-cho; Naka-ku, Yokohama, Kanagawa; Japan; 35.429541°N 139.665658°E

Information
- Type: International (Private)
- Established: 1924
- Head of school: Carla Marschall
- Faculty: 120+
- Grades: Pre School - Grade 12
- Enrollment: 820+
- Colours: Red, White
- Mascot: Smokey the Dragon
- Website: yis.ac.jp

Yokohama International School (横浜インターナショナルスクール) is a co-educational international school located in Naka-ku, Yokohama, Japan.

The school consists of a pre-school (Early Learning Centre), a kindergarten/ elementary school (grades K-5), a middle school (6-8) and a high school (9-12), covering a total of 13 academic years. The language of instruction is English although Japanese, French, Spanish, Korean, and German language options are also offered to interested students according to language proficiency. The school offers a wide variety of curricula; it offers the International Baccalaureate Primary Years Program, the International Baccalaureate Middle Years Program (MYP) in its first two years of high school, and then the International Baccalaureate Diploma Program (IB DP) in the latter 2 years of high school. The SAT is another external exam offered at the school.

== History ==
Yokohama International School was established in 1924, shortly after the 1923 Great Kantō earthquake by a group of foreign residents in Yokohama. The first class was held on 27 October 1924 in a local YMCA facility with six enrolled students. Yokohama International School was the second school in the modern era to use the word ‘international’ in its name behind the International School of Geneva which opened its doors just weeks before.

In 1936 the school principal, the Rev. Roger Pott, opened a boarding facility that drew in expatriate students from across Japan. Echoing the routines of a British public school of the period, students began each day with a mandatory chapel service and boys and girls alike wore grey school uniforms with jackets trimmed in red. Students would typically spend a portion of the summer months at hostel facilities in Karuizawa. Student demographics reflected the diversity of the Yokohama foreign community with a wide mix of nationalities represented. By March 1937, the number of students had reached 102 compared to 52 in the previous year instructed by a teaching staff of twelve. In the same year the Yokohama Country and Athletic Club agreed for the school to use its field on Wednesday afternoons for cricket and football. By 1939, the school had 110 enrolled students from 21 nationalities.

The school was forced to close at the outbreak of wartime hostilities in December 1941. During the Second World War the school site initially became a refugee centre for German nationals and later, an air defense training school. The original school structures were destroyed during the aerial bombing of Yokohama on 29 May 1945.

After the war, the school was reopened in September 1955 as a non-denominational day school close to its original site. The school continued to expand in both facilities and enrolment through the 1960s and 1970s, and initiated its first International Baccalaureate Diploma Programme (IBDP) from 1986. It became fully accredited in 1991 by the European Council of International Schools (ECIS) and the New England Association of Schools and Colleges (NEASC). Building on the school’s progressive track record in curriculum development, in 2000 the school became the first institution in Japan to offer a Reggio Emilia program for the early learners, and a year later became the first school in Japan authorized to offer the IB Primary Years Programme.

Currently, the school has a student body of over 750 comprising over 50 nationalities and faculty and staff of over 120 spanning 15 nationalities. The school caters primarily to the foreign community in Yokohama and the nearby Tokyo suburbs as well as Japanese students that have spent extended periods overseas.

== Curriculum ==
- Early Learning Center (age 3 to 4): IB Primary Years Programme (PYP)
- Elementary School (K to 5): IB Primary Years Programme (PYP).
- Middle School (Grades 6-8): IB Middle Years Programme (MYP).
- High School (Grades 9-12): IB Middle Years Programme (MYP) and the IB Diploma Programme (IBDP).

== Facilities ==
Previously located in Yamate Yokohama, on an elevated ridge overlooking the city, in January 2022 the school moved to a new campus in Naka-Ku with expanded school buildings and athletics facilities designed by the office of Yokohama architect Kengo Kuma.

== See also ==
- List of junior high schools in Kanagawa Prefecture
- List of elementary schools in Kanagawa Prefecture

== Notable faculty ==
- Pat Barr (writer)
- Stelarc (performance artist)
