= Tokyo West International School =

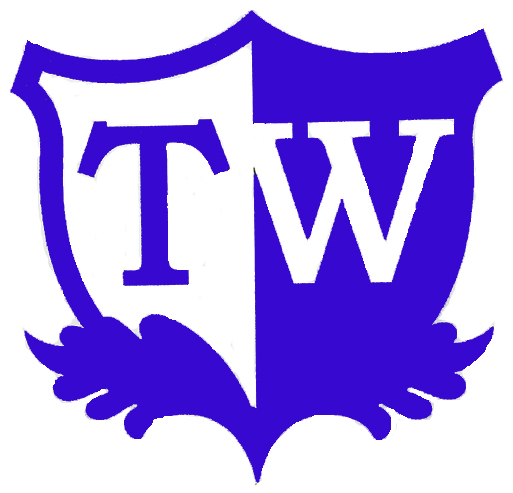

Location
- 185 Umetsubo-machi; Hachioji 192-0013, Tokyo; Japan; 35.68672°N 139.33894°E

Information
- Type: International
- Established: 2010
- Headmistress: Yukiko Kawasaki
- Grades: Pre School - Middle school
- Color: Blue
- Website: Tokyo West International School Website

Tokyo West International School is an international kindergarten, elementary and middle school in Hachioji (Western Tokyo), Japan.

== History ==
The school was established in April 2010 in the city of Hachioji by Yoshinori Kato. Its creation arose from the need to cater for students graduating from Kunitachi Kids International School, in Kunitachi, Tokyo.

The first campus was in Shibazaki. There were 12 students in the first elementary class. The following year, the campus moved to Sunagawa, and added the 2nd and 3rd grades to the school's elementary division. In 2013, the Sunagawa campus was moved to Hachioji, the 3rd, 4th and 5th grade classes were moved there while the new main building was under construction. In 2014, all the elementary school students moved to Hachioji campus. Then 2015, all Tokyo West International School students moved to the new Hachioji main campus.

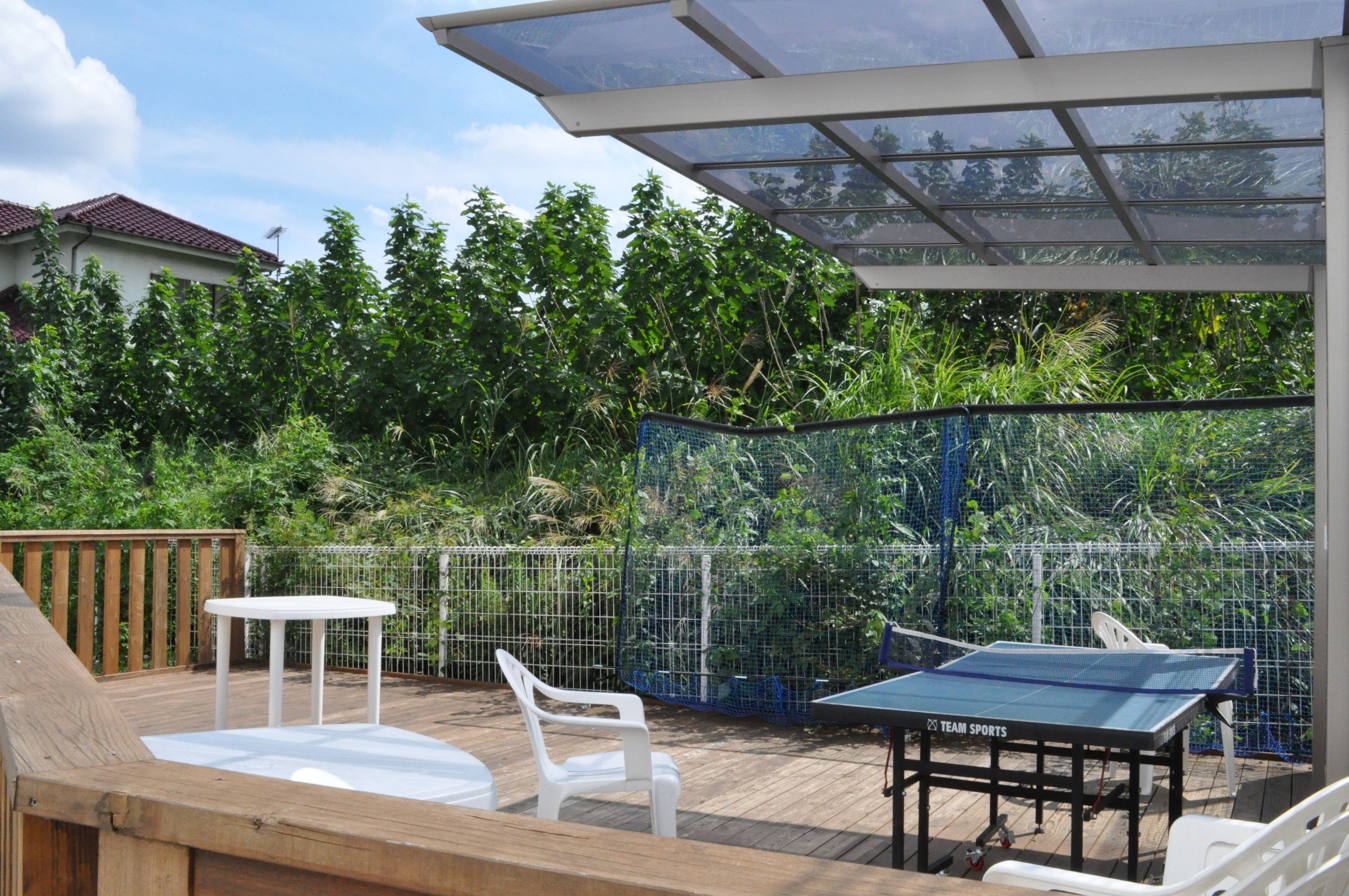
TWIS outdoor table tennis deck

The school is composed of a kindergarten, an elementary school and a middle school : 12 classes spanning from K-2 to Grade 9. The staff is composed of 20 homeroom teachers and 8 specialist teachers (Japanese, Music and Physical Education).

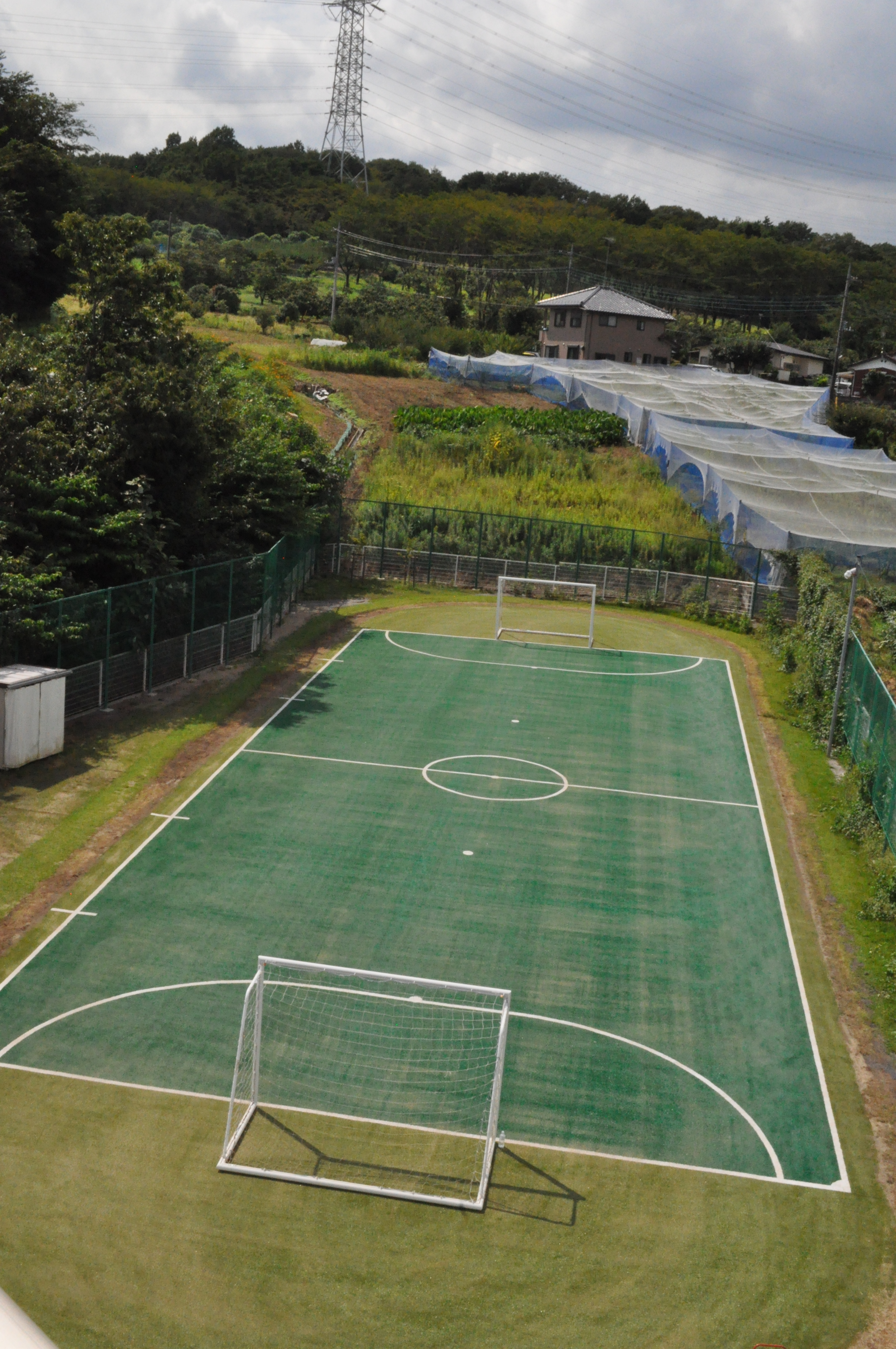
TWIS outdoor playground

== Facilities ==
The school's facilities currently include 12 classrooms, a library, a science room, a music room, an outdoor swimming pool, an artificial turf field, an tent gym as well as a small netted rooftop.

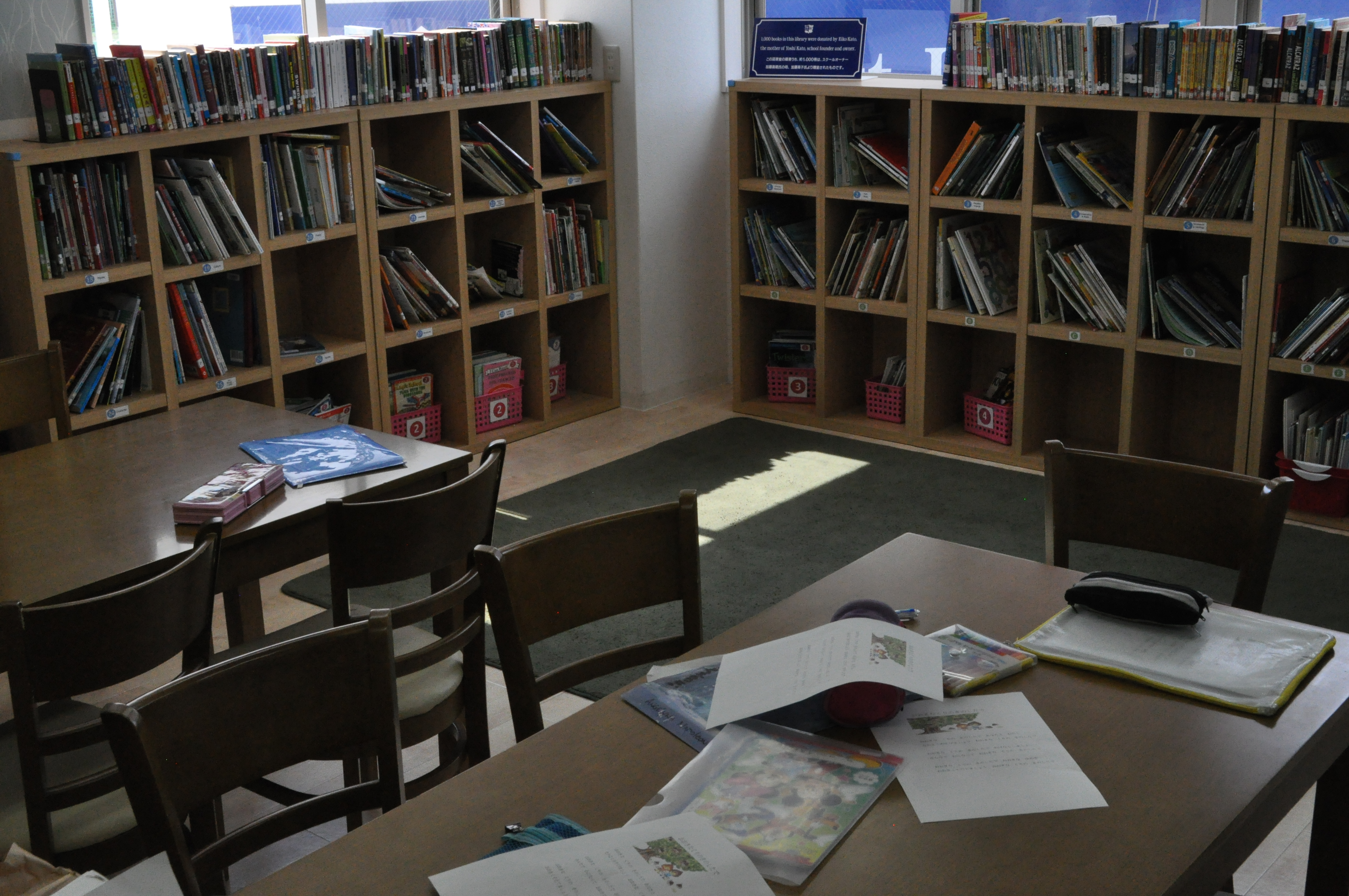
TWIS library

== Accreditation ==
Tokyo West International School is accredited by the AdvancED and attempted to gain accreditation from the WASC (Western Association of Schools and Colleges) accreditation procedure.

The school has gained the following academic accreditations:

- March 2021 - Cognia
- November 2021 - Earcos
- April 2022 - IB Primary Years Programme
- March 2023 - Council of International Schools Member
