= Higashi-ku, Hiroshima =

Ward of Hiroshima, Japan

Higashi-ku 東区
- Ward
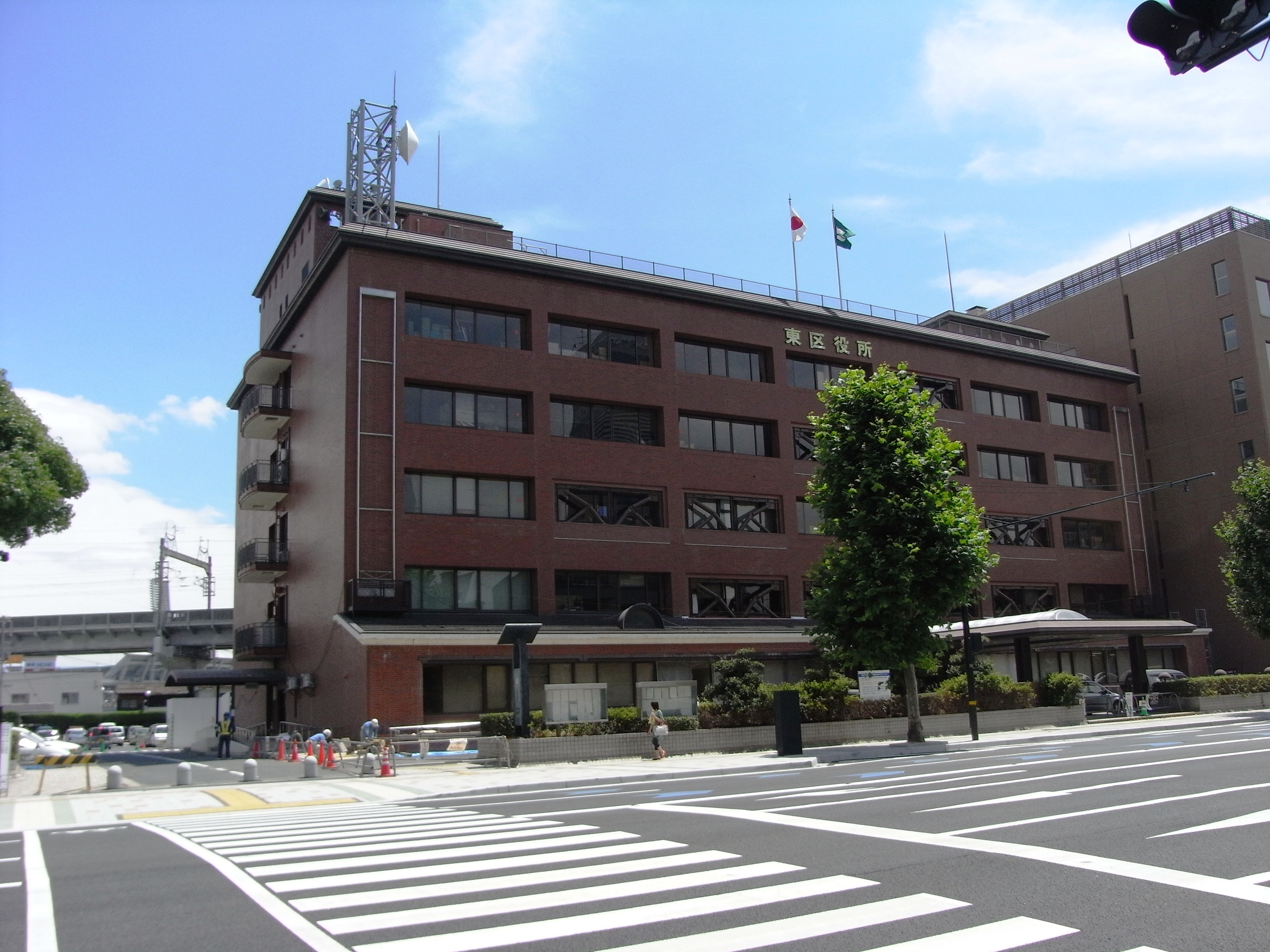
- Higashi Ward Office

- Flag Seal

- Location of Higashi-ku in Hiroshima City

- Location within Japan
- Coordinates: 34°23′43″N 132°28′58″E
- Country: Japan
- Region: Chūgoku (Sanyo)
- Prefecture: Hiroshima
- City: Hiroshima
- Established: April 1, 1980

Area
  - Total: 39.42 km^{2} (15.22 sq mi)

Population (August 1, 2026)
  - Total: 115,119
  - Density: 2,920/km^{2} (7,600/sq mi)
- Time zone: UTC+9 (Japan Standard Time)
- Postal: 732-8510
- Higashi Ward Office's Address: 9-38 Higashikaniya-cho, Higashi-ku, Hiroshima City, Hiroshima Prefecture (広島県広島市東区東蟹屋町9番38号)
- Website: Official site

Higashi-ku (東区, lit. "eastern ward") is one of the eight wards located in Hiroshima, Japan. It is located on the uppermost delta of the Ōta River.

Within Higashi-ku is the Fudoin Temple in Ushita-shinmachi. Fudoin dates back to the 14th century and was built by shōgun Ashikaga Takauji as one of 60 Ankoku-ji temples which were constructed in all provinces across Japan. The Kondo (main hall) of the Fudoin Temple, one of the largest remaining structures in the medieval Kara style in the country, is the only designated national treasure in Hiroshima City.

== Geography ==
The old city area—specifically the school districts of Futaba, Ushita, Waseda, and Hesaka Junior High Schools—is located along the Ōta River and its tributary, the Enkō River, which form the western and southern boundaries of Higashi Ward. This area consists of flat land surrounding Mount Ushita, which has an elevation of 261 meters.

The former Aki Town area—corresponding to the school districts of Nukushina and Fukugi Junior High Schools—stretches along the Nukushina River (also known as the Fuchū Ōkawa) from the southwest to the northeast. This region, covering 22.7 square kilometers, is enclosed on three sides by mountains, including Mount Gusashōyama, which stands at 682 meters. From the 1960s onward, residential developments began to take shape, and the area experienced further urbanization following the opening of the Hiroshima East Interchange on the Sanyō Expressway in 1987 (Showa 62).

== Education ==
There are two universities in the Ward, Hiroshima Jogakuin University and Hijiyama University.

The ward has a North Korean school, Hiroshima Korean School.

The South Korean government maintains the Korea Education Institution (Korean: 히로시마한국교육원, Japanese: 広島韓国教育院) in Higashi-ku.
