= Park Il-gyu =

Japanese footballer (born 1989)

Park Il-gyu 朴 一圭
Personal information
- Full name: Park Il-gyu
- Date of birth: 22 December 1989 (age 36)
- Place of birth: Saitama, Japan
- Height: 1.80 m (5 ft 11 in)
- Position: Goalkeeper

Team information
- Current team: Yokohama F. Marinos
- Number: 1

Youth career
- 2002–2004: Tokyo Korean Junior High School
- 2005–2007: Tokyo Korean High School

College career
| Years | Team | Apps | (Gls) |
| 2008–2011 | Korea University | | |

Senior career*
| Years | Team | Apps | (Gls) |
| 2012 | Fujieda MYFC | 16 | (0) |
| 2013 | FC Korea | 15 | (0) |
| 2014–2015 | Fujieda MYFC | 65 | (0) |
| 2016–2018 | FC Ryūkyū | 82 | (0) |
| 2019–2020 | Yokohama F. Marinos | 37 | (0) |
| 2020 | → Sagan Tosu (loan) | 10 | (0) |
| 2021–2024 | Sagan Tosu | 144 | (0) |
| 2025– | Yokohama F. Marinos | 40 | (0) |
- * Club domestic league appearances and goals as of 11 August 2026

- Park Il-gyu
- Hangul: 박일규
- Hanja: 朴一圭
- RR: Bak Ilgyu
- MR: Pak Ilgyu

Park Il-gyu (朴 一圭, Paku Irugyu; Korean: 박일규; born 22 December 1989) is a Japanese professional footballer who plays as a goalkeeper and currently plays for J1 League club Yokohama F. Marinos.

== Career ==
Park attended Korea University (Japan) before signing for Fujieda MYFC in 2012. He played for one season, before going to FC Korea and then returning again to Fujieda. In January 2016, he signed for another J3 team, FC Ryūkyū.

In 2019 he signed for J1 League club Yokohama F. Marinos.

On 13 December 2024, Park returned to Yokohama F. Marinos from 2025 season on a permanent transfer.

== Career statistics ==
=== Club ===
As of the start for 2025 season.

Appearances and goals by club, season and competition
| Club | Season | League | | | National cup | | League cup | | Other | | Total | |
| Club | Season | Division | Apps | Goals | Apps | Goals | Apps | Goals | Apps | Goals | Apps | Goals |
| Japan | | | League | | Emperor's Cup | | J. League Cup | | Other | | Total | |
|---|---|---|---|---|---|---|---|---|---|---|---|---|
| Fujieda MYFC | 2012 | JFL | 16 | 0 | - | | - | | - | | 16 | 0 |
| FC Korea | 2013 | Kantō Div 1 | 15 | 0 | - | | - | | - | | 15 | 0 |
| Fujieda MYFC | 2014 | J3 League | 32 | 0 | 2 | 0 | - | | - | | 34 | 0 |
| Fujieda MYFC | 2015 | J3 League | 33 | 0 | 3 | 0 | - | | - | | 36 | 0 |
| Fujieda MYFC | Total | | 65 | 0 | 5 | 0 | 0 | 0 | 0 | 0 | 70 | 0 |
| FC Ryukyu | 2016 | J3 League | 26 | 0 | 2 | 0 | - | | - | | 28 | 0 |
| FC Ryukyu | 2017 | J3 League | 27 | 0 | 0 | 0 | - | | - | | 27 | 0 |
| FC Ryukyu | 2018 | J3 League | 29 | 0 | 1 | 0 | - | | - | | 30 | 0 |
| FC Ryukyu | Total | | 82 | 0 | 3 | 0 | 0 | 0 | 0 | 0 | 85 | 0 |
| Yokohama F. Marinos | 2019 | J1 League | 25 | 0 | 2 | 0 | 3 | 0 | - | | 30 | 0 |
| Yokohama F. Marinos | 2020 | J1 League | 12 | 0 | 0 | 0 | 1 | 0 | 1 (Note: Appearances in the Japanese Super Cup) | 0 | 13 | 0 |
| Yokohama F. Marinos | Total | | 37 | 0 | 2 | 0 | 4 | 0 | 1 | 0 | 44 | 0 |
| Sagan Tosu (loan) | 2020 | J1 League | 10 | 0 | 0 | 0 | 0 | 0 | - | | 10 | 0 |
| Sagan Tosu | 2021 | J1 League | 38 | 0 | 3 | 0 | 0 | 0 | - | | 41 | 0 |
| Sagan Tosu | 2022 | J1 League | 34 | 0 | 2 | 0 | 2 | 0 | - | | 38 | 0 |
| Sagan Tosu | 2023 | J1 League | 34 | 0 | 1 | 0 | 1 | 0 | - | | 36 | 0 |
| Sagan Tosu | 2024 | J1 League | 38 | 0 | 0 | 0 | 1 | 0 | - | | 39 | 0 |
| Sagan Tosu | Total | | 144 | 0 | 6 | 0 | 4 | 0 | 0 | 0 | 154 | 0 |
| Yokohama F. Marinos | 2025 | J1 League | 0 | 0 | 0 | 0 | 0 | 0 | - | | 0 | 0 |
| Yokohama F. Marinos | Total | | 0 | 0 | 0 | 0 | 0 | 0 | 0 | 0 | 0 | 0 |
| Career total | | | 299 | 0 | 16 | 0 | 8 | 0 | 1 | 0 | 314 | 0 |

== Honours ==
=== Club ===
FC Ryukyu

- J3 League (1): 2018

Yokohama F. Marinos

- J1 League (1): 2019

=== Individual ===
Yokohama F. Marinos

- J.League Outstanding Player award (1): 2019

== Personal life ==
Park is a Zainichi Korean, previously holding North Korean, and then South Korean nationalities.
