= Yamaguchi Korean High School =

North Korea-affiliated school in Japan

- 山口朝鮮高級学校 야마구찌조선고급학교

Location
- 2-9-1 Chōfu Saigawa; Shimonoseki, Yamaguchi Prefecture, 752-0928; Japan; 34°01′36″N 131°00′02″E

Information
- Type: Private Korean high school
- Established: 1972; 54 years ago
- Closed: 2004
- Grades: Senior high school

Yamaguchi Korean High School (山口朝鮮高級学校, Yamaguchi Chōsen Kōkyūgakkō) (Korean: 야마구찌조선고급학교) was a North Korean high school in Shimonoseki, Yamaguchi Prefecture, Japan.

== History ==
Yamaguchi Korean High School opened in 1972 as a senior-high-level Korean school in Shimonoseki. It was one of several Korean schools that operated in Yamaguchi Prefecture.

The high school suspended operations in 2004. A research report on Korean schools states that it was incorporated into Kyushu Korean Junior-Senior High School in the same year.
