= Dorothy Robins-Mowry =

American diplomat (1921–2021)

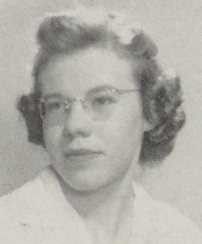
- Dorothy Robins (later Mowry), from the 1942 yearbook of the College of Wooster
- Born: Dorothy B. Robins; September 21, 1921; Brooklyn, New York, U.S.
- Died: July 6, 2021 (age 99); St. Michaels, Maryland, U.S.
- Other names: Dorothy Mowry
- Occupation(s): Diplomat, writer, educator

Dorothy B. Robins-Mowry (September 21, 1921 – July 6, 2021) was an American diplomat and writer. She was a foreign service officer with the United States Information Agency (USIA) from 1963 to 1984. Her assignments included cultural roles at the United States embassies in Tokyo in the 1960s and in Tehran in the 1970s.

== Early life and education ==
Robins was born in Brooklyn, the daughter of William Albert Robins and Emma J. Koffre Robins. Her father was a marine engineer. Her mother died in 1934.

Robins graduated from the College of Wooster in 1942, earned a master's degree from Columbia University, and completed doctoral studies in government at New York University, with a dissertation titled "U.S. Non-Governmental Organizations and the Educational Campaign from Dumbarton Oaks, 1944 through the San Francisco Conference, 1945."

== Career ==
In her early career, Robins held several education policy roles with the American Association for the United Nations, the American Association of University Women, and the Foreign Policy Association. She was a foreign service officer with the United States Information Agency (USIA). From 1963 to 1971 she was in charge of the USIA's cultural and educational activities, and women's programs at the United States Embassy in Tokyo. She was cultural attaché at the United States Embassy in Tehran from 1974 to 1979. She also was a policy officer for North Africa, the Middle East, and South Asia, a country affairs officer for India, Nepal, and Sri Lanka. She retired from the USIA in 1984. She was president of the USIA Alumni Association. "Representing America abroad increases one's patriotism — or perhaps one's awareness of it," she told an interviewer in 1975. "When our country does something that confirms our image as a nation of freedom, justice and equality of opportunity, then we're tremendously proud."

In 1980 and 1981, Robins-Mowry taught political science courses at the University of Maryland. She was a research associate at the Woodrow Wilson International Center for Scholars from 1984 to 1989, and as associate director of seminars at the Aspen Institute for Humanistic Studies. She was associated with the Pacific Institute in the 1990s.

Robins-Mowry was named a distinguished alumna of the College of Wooster in 1997, and earned a Meritorious Honor Award from the USIA twice, in 1967 and 1981. She received an honorary doctorate from Soongsil University in South Korea, and an honorary Doctor of Laws degree from the College of Wooster in 1966.

In her later years she was a lecturer with the Phi Beta Kappa society. She was active in the Talbot River Protection Association and the Riverview Garden Club. She and her husband began a youth sailing program at the Miles River Yacht Club, and funded an award for sportsmanship.

== Publications ==
- The UN in World Affairs: Program Guide to Continuing Educational Programs (1954)
- Experiment in democracy : the story of U.S. citizen organizations in forging the charter of the United Nations (1971, based on her dissertation)
- "The Special Collections in the University of Cape Town Libraries" (1977)
- The Hidden Sun: Women of Modern Japan (1983)
- Canada-U.S. Relations: Perceptions and Misperceptions (1988, editor)
- "Is a Korea-Japan Symbiosis Possible?" (1996)
- "Westernizing Influences in the Early Modernization of Japanese Women's Education" (2019)
- "Not a Foreigner, but a Sensei—a Teacher: Nannie B. Gaines of Hiroshima" (2019)

== Personal life ==
Robins married Monsanto executive David Thomas Mowry in 1971, "the same year that the foreign service began allowing women to marry", noted one profile. David Mowry died in 1992. She died in 2021, at the age of 99, at her home in St. Michaels, Maryland.
