= 2020 J1 League =

28th season of J1 League

J1 League
- Season: 2020
- Dates: 21 February – 19 December 2020
- Champions: Kawasaki Frontale; 3rd J1 title 3rd Japanese title
- Relegated: None
- Champions League: Kawasaki Frontale; Gamba Osaka; Nagoya Grampus; Cerezo Osaka
- Matches: 306
- Goals: 857 (2.8 per match)
- Top goalscorer: Michael Olunga (28 goals)
- Biggest home win: Urawa Red Diamonds 6–0 Vegalta Sendai (18 October 2020)
- Biggest away win: Hokkaido Consadole Sapporo 1–6 Kawasaki Frontale (15 August 2020)
- Highest scoring: Nagoya Grampus 6–2 Urawa Red Diamonds (8 August 2020); Yokohama F. Marinos 6–2 Urawa Red Diamonds (14 November 2020)
- Longest winning run: 12 matches Kawasaki Frontale
- Longest unbeaten run: 13 matches Kawasaki Frontale
- Longest winless run: 17 matches Vegalta Sendai
- Longest losing run: 7 matches Shimizu S-Pulse
- Highest attendance: 34,521; Yokohama F. Marinos 1–2 Gamba Osaka (23 February 2020)
- Lowest attendance: 1,948; Sanfrecce Hiroshima 4–1 Shimizu S-Pulse (9 September 2020) (excluding matches played behind closed doors)
- Total attendance: 1,773,481
- Average attendance: 5,796 (including matches played behind closed doors)

The 2020 J1 League, also known as the 2020 Meiji Yasuda J1 League (Japanese: 2020 明治安田生命J1リーグ, Hepburn: 2020 Meiji Yasuda Seimei J1 Rīgu) for sponsorship reasons, was the 28th season of the J1 League, the top Japanese professional league for association football clubs, since its establishment in 1992. This was sixth season of J1 League as renamed from J. League Division 1. The league began on 21 February and eventually ended on 19 December 2020. The league was planned to have a season break to avoid clashing with the 2020 Summer Olympics, but the Olympics were postponed due to the COVID-19 pandemic in Japan.

Yokohama F. Marinos were the defending champions while Kashiwa Reysol and Yokohama FC entered the league as promoted teams from the 2019 J2 League, replacing Júbilo Iwata and Matsumoto Yamaga who were relegated to the 2020 J2 League.

== Effects of the COVID-19 pandemic ==
On 25 February, all J.League matches until 15 March were postponed in response to the COVID-19 pandemic in Japan. After that, it was announced that it would be postponed further until 29 March. On 19 March, the J.League announced no relegation would take place for the 2020 season, with the J1 League expanding to 20 clubs for the 2021 season. On 25 March, the league announced that it would be suspended again from 3 April to 6 May.

On 3 April, the Japan Professional Football League decided to resume the league, gradually resumed J3 from 25 April, J2 from 2 May, and J1 from 9 May. However, the league was postponed again.

On 29 May, the JPFL decided to resume the season on 27 June. The season is projected to resume on 4 July. On 9 June, the JPFL announced the new schedule of the 2020 season. On 15 June, it was announced that the first 2 matches in each league (J1, J2, and J3) would be held without spectators. After 10 July, as a general rule, the maximum number of people allowed is 5,000. The stadiums with less than 10,000 capacity would have up to 50% of the capacity. Away supporters are not allowed. After August, the maximum stadium capacity was 50%, and there would be "high alert spectator matches".

After the 11th J.League extraordinary executive committee meeting on 20 July, it was announced that the "super strict alert audience game" extended to 10 August in view of the spread of coronavirus infection.

== Clubs ==
Locations of the 2020 J1 League teams
2020 J1 League teams in Greater Tokyo Area
2020 J1 League teams in Keihanshin

For the 2020 season, there were only two changes in the league. Kashiwa Reysol returned as the 2019 J2 League champions and Yokohama FC as runners-up after 13 seasons absence from the top tier of Japanese football. They replaced Matsumoto Yamaga (one season in J1) and Júbilo Iwata (four seasons in J1), who were relegated to the 2020 J2 League.

Meanwhile, Shonan Bellmare remained in the J1 League after defeating Tokushima Vortis in the 2019 J2 League play-off final.

Club	Location	Stadium	Capacity	Last season
Hokkaido Consadole Sapporo	Hokkaido	Sapporo Dome; Sapporo Atsubetsu Stadium	41,484; 20,861	J1 (10th)
Vegalta Sendai	Miyagi Prefecture	Yurtec Stadium Sendai	19,694	J1 (11th)
Kashima Antlers	Ibaraki Prefecture	Kashima Soccer Stadium	40,728	J1 (3rd)
Urawa Red Diamonds	Saitama Prefecture	Saitama Stadium 2002	63,700	J1 (14th)
Kashiwa Reysol	Chiba Prefecture	Hitachi Kashiwa Stadium	15,900	J2 (champions)
FC Tokyo	Tokyo	Ajinomoto Stadium	49,970	J1 (2nd)
Yokohama FC	Kanagawa Prefecture	Mitsuzawa Stadium	15,046	J2 (2nd)
Yokohama F. Marinos	Kanagawa Prefecture	Nissan Stadium	72,327	**J1 (champions)**
Shonan Bellmare	Kanagawa Prefecture	BMW Stadium Hiratsuka	18,500	J1 (16th)
Kawasaki Frontale	Kanagawa Prefecture	Todoroki Stadium	26,232	J1 (4th)
Shimizu S-Pulse	Shizuoka Prefecture	IAI Stadium Nihondaira	20,339	J1 (12th)
Nagoya Grampus	Aichi Prefecture	Paloma Mizuho Stadium; Toyota Stadium	27,001 45,000	J1 (13th)
Gamba Osaka	Osaka Prefecture	Panasonic Stadium Suita	39,694	J1 (7th)
Cerezo Osaka	Osaka Prefecture	Yanmar Stadium	47,853	J1 (5th)
Vissel Kobe	Hyōgo Prefecture	Noevir Stadium Kobe	30,132	J1 (8th)
Sanfrecce Hiroshima	Hiroshima Prefecture	Edion Stadium	36,894	J1 (6th)
Oita Trinita	Ōita Prefecture	Showa Denko Dome Oita	40,000	J1 (9th)
Sagan Tosu	Saga Prefecture	Ekimae Stadium	24,130	J1 (15th)

=== Personnel and kits ===
Club	Manager	Kit manufacturer	Front shirt sponsor
Cerezo Osaka	(Spain) Miguel Ángel Lotina	Puma	Yanmar
FC Tokyo	(Japan) Kenta Hasegawa	Umbro	XFLAG
Gamba Osaka	(Japan) Tsuneyasu Miyamoto	Umbro	Panasonic
Hokkaido Consadole Sapporo	(Serbia) Mihailo Petrović	Kappa	Ishiya
Kashima Antlers	(Brazil) Antônio Carlos Zago	Nike	Lixil
Kashiwa Reysol	(Brazil) Nelsinho Baptista	Yonex	Hitachi
Kawasaki Frontale	(Japan) Toru Oniki	Puma	Fujitsu
Nagoya Grampus	(Italy) Massimo Ficcadenti	Mizuno	Toyota
Oita Trinita	(Japan) Tomohiro Katanosaka	Puma	Daihatsu Kyushu
Sagan Tosu	(South Korea) Kim Myung-hwi	New Balance	Kimura Information Technology
Sanfrecce Hiroshima	(Japan) Hiroshi Jofuku	Nike	EDION
Shimizu S-Pulse	(Japan) Hiroaki Hiraoka	Puma	Suzuyo
Shonan Bellmare	(Japan) Bin Ukishima	Penalty	Meldia
Urawa Red Diamonds	(Japan) Tsuyoshi Otsuki	Nike	Mitsubishi Heavy Industries
Vegalta Sendai	(Japan) Takashi Kiyama	Adidas	Iris Ohyama
Vissel Kobe	(Japan) Atsuhiro Miura	Asics	Rakuten
Yokohama FC	(Japan) Takahiro Shimotaira	Soccer Junky	Onodera Group
Yokohama F. Marinos	(Australia) Ange Postecoglou	Adidas	Nissan

=== Managerial changes ===
Team	Outgoing manager	Manner of departure	Date of vacancy	Incoming manager	Date of appointment
Vissel Kobe	(Germany) Thorsten Fink	Change of director	21 September 2020	(Japan) Atsuhiro Miura	25 September 2020
Shimizu S-Pulse	(Australia) Peter Cklamovski	Sacked	1 November 2020	(Japan) Hiroaki Hiraoka	1 November 2020

=== Foreign players ===
As of 2019 season, there are no more restrictions on a number of signed foreign players, but clubs can only register up to five foreign players for a single match-day squad. Players from J.League partner nations (Thailand, Vietnam, Myanmar, Malaysia, Cambodia, Singapore, Indonesia and Qatar) are exempt from these restrictions.

- Players name in **bold** indicates the player is registered during the mid-season transfer window.
- Player's name in italics indicates the player has Japanese nationality in addition to their FIFA nationality, or is exempt from being treated as a foreign player due to having been born in Japan and being enrolled in, or having graduated from school in the country.

Club	Player 1	Player 2	Player 3	Player 4	Player 5	Player 6	Player 7	Player 8	Player 9	Player 10	Former players
Cerezo Osaka	(Argentina) Leandro Desábato	(Australia) Pierce Waring	(Brazil) Bruno Mendes	(Croatia) Matej Jonjić	(South Korea) Ahn Joon-soo	(South Korea) Kim Jin-hyeon	(Thailand) Tawan Khotrsupho				(Brazil) Lucas Mineiro
FC Tokyo	(Brazil) Adaílton	(Brazil) Arthur Silva	(Brazil) Diego Oliveira	(Brazil) Leandro	(Lebanon) Joan Oumari						
Gamba Osaka	(Brazil) Ademilson	(Brazil) Patric	(Philippines) Jefferson Tabinas	(South Korea) Kim Young-gwon	(South Korea) Lee Yun-oh	(South Korea) Shin Won-ho					
Hokkaido Consadole Sapporo	(Brazil) Anderson Lopes	(Brazil) Douglas Oliveira	(Brazil) Lucas Fernandes	(England) Jay Bothroyd	(Portugal) **Hugo Vieira**	(South Korea) Kim Min-tae	(Thailand) Chanathip Songkrasin	(Thailand) Kawin Thamsatchanan			(South Korea) Gu Sung-yun
Kashima Antlers	(Brazil) Everaldo	(Brazil) Juan Alano	(Brazil) Léo Silva	(South Korea) Kwoun Sun-tae							
Kashiwa Reysol	(Brazil) Cristiano	(Brazil) Matheus Sávio	(Brazil) Richardson	(Kenya) Michael Olunga	(South Korea) Kim Seung-gyu						(Brazil) Júnior Santos
Kawasaki Frontale	(Brazil) Diogo Mateus	(Brazil) Jesiel	(Brazil) Leandro Damião	(South Korea) Jung Sung-ryong							
Nagoya Grampus	(Australia) Mitchell Langerak	(Brazil) Gabriel Xavier	(Brazil) João Schmidt	(Brazil) Mateus	(South Korea) Oh Jae-suk						
Oita Trinita	(South Korea) Mun Kyung-gun										
Sagan Tosu	(Brazil) Eduardo	(Brazil) Tiago Alves	(China) Wang Jianan	(North Korea) Ryang Yong-gi	(South Korea) An Yong-woo	(South Korea) Cho Dong-geon	(South Korea) Kim Min-ho	(South Korea) **Park Il-gyu**	(South Korea) Park Jeong-su	(Uruguay) Renzo López	
Sanfrecce Hiroshima	(Brazil) Douglas Vieira	(Brazil) Ezequiel	(Brazil) Leandro Pereira	(Brazil) Rhayner							
Shimizu S-Pulse	(Brazil) Carlinhos Júnior	(Brazil) Elsinho	(Brazil) Junior Dutra	(Brazil) Neto Volpi	(Brazil) Renato Augusto	(Brazil) Valdo	(South Korea) Hwang Seok-ho	(Thailand) Teerasil Dangda			
Shonan Bellmare	(Brazil) **Riuler**	(Norway) Tarik Elyounoussi									
Urawa Red Diamonds	(Australia) Thomas Deng	(Brazil) Ewerton	(Brazil) Leonardo	(Curaçao) Quenten Martinus							(Brazil) Fabrício (Brazil) Maurício Antônio
Vegalta Sendai	(Brazil) Pará	(Mozambique) Simão Mate Junior	(Poland) Jakub Słowik	(Portugal) Alexandre Guedes	(South Korea) Kim Jung-ya	(Spain) Isaac Cuenca					
Vissel Kobe	(Belgium) Thomas Vermaelen	(Brazil) Dankler	(Brazil) Douglas	(Spain) Andrés Iniesta	(Spain) Sergi Samper						
Yokohama FC	(Brazil) Leandro Domingues	(Brazil) Maguinho	(Netherlands) Calvin Jong-a-Pin								
Yokohama F. Marinos	(Brazil) Erik	(Brazil) **Júnior Santos**	(Brazil) Marcos Júnior	(Brazil) Thiago Martins	(Thailand) Theerathon Bunmathan						(Brazil) Edigar Junio (South Korea) Park Il-gyu

== League table ==
It was decided on 19 March to change the format regarding the rules for promotion/relegation for the end of the season for the J1, J2 and J3 leagues, such that there would be no relegation this season, that two clubs from the J2 League would be promoted to the 2021 J1 League, and that two clubs from the J3 League would be promoted to the 2021 J2 League (subject to licensing regulations).

Pos	Team	Pld	W	D	L	GF	GA	GD	Pts	Qualification or relegation
1	Kawasaki Frontale (C)	34	26	5	3	88	31	+57	83	Qualification for AFC Champions League group stage (Note: Since the winners of the 2020 Emperor's Cup, Kawasaki Frontale, qualified for the Champions League group stage, the spot given to the Emperor's Cup winners (Champions League group stage) was passed to the third-placed team and the spot given to the third-place team (Champions League play-off round) was passed to the fourth-placed team.)
2	Gamba Osaka	34	20	5	9	46	42	+4	65	Qualification for AFC Champions League group stage
3	Nagoya Grampus	34	19	6	9	45	28	+17	63	Qualification for AFC Champions League group stage
4	Cerezo Osaka	34	18	6	10	46	37	+9	60	Qualification for AFC Champions League play-off round
5	Kashima Antlers	34	18	5	11	55	44	+11	59	
6	FC Tokyo	34	17	6	11	47	42	+5	57	
7	Kashiwa Reysol	34	15	7	12	60	46	+14	52	
8	Sanfrecce Hiroshima	34	13	9	12	46	37	+9	48	
9	Yokohama F. Marinos	34	14	5	15	69	59	+10	47	
10	Urawa Red Diamonds	34	13	7	14	43	56	−13	46	
11	Oita Trinita	34	11	10	13	36	45	−9	43	
12	Hokkaido Consadole Sapporo	34	10	9	15	47	58	−11	39	
13	Sagan Tosu	34	7	15	12	37	43	−6	36	
14	Vissel Kobe	34	9	9	16	50	59	−9	36	
15	Yokohama FC	34	9	6	19	38	60	−22	33	
16	Shimizu S-Pulse	34	7	7	20	48	70	−22	28	
17	Vegalta Sendai	34	6	10	18	36	61	−25	28	
18	Shonan Bellmare	34	6	9	19	29	48	−19	27	

Source: J.League Data Site
Rules for classification: 1) Points; 2) Goal difference; 3) Head-to-head points; 4) Head-to-head goal difference; 5) Head-to-head goal scored; 6) Number of wins; 7) Goals scored; 8) Fair-play points.
(C) Champions

== Results table ==
Home \ Away	ANT	BEL	CER	CON	FMA	FRO	GAM	GRA	REY	RED	SAG	SFR	SSP	TOK	TRI	VEG	VIS	YFC
Kashima Antlers	—	1–0	1–1	0–2	4–2	1–1	1–1	0–2	1–4	4–0	2–0	1–0	2–0	2–2	0–2	2–1	2–2	3–2
Shonan Bellmare	1–0	—	0–1	0–0	1–0	0–1	1–2	0–1	3–2	2–3	0–0	1–1	0–3	0–1	1–2	0–1	1–1	1–0
Cerezo Osaka	1–2	1–0	—	2–0	4–1	1–3	1–1	0–2	0–0	3–0	1–2	0–1	2–0	0–0	1–0	2–1	0–0	1–0
Hokkaido Consadole Sapporo	1–0	2–1	1–3	—	3–1	1–6	0–1	0–0	0–1	3–4	1–1	0–2	5–1	1–1	1–1	3–3	2–3	3–0
Yokohama F. Marinos	2–3	3–2	1–2	4–1	—	1–3	1–2	2–1	1–1	6–2	1–1	3–1	3–0	1–3	4–0	3–1	2–3	4–0
Kawasaki Frontale	2–1	3–1	5–2	0–2	3–1	—	5–0	3–0	3–1	3–1	0–0	5–1	5–0	2–1	2–0	1–0	3–2	3–2
Gamba Osaka	2–0	0–1	1–2	2–1	1–1	0–1	—	2–1	2–1	1–3	1–1	1–0	0–2	1–3	2–1	0–4	1–0	2–1
Nagoya Grampus	1–3	3–1	1–0	3–0	2–1	1–0	2–2	—	0–1	6–2	1–0	1–0	3–1	1–0	0–0	1–0	2–1	0–0
Kashiwa Reysol	2–3	3–2	1–3	4–2	1–3	2–3	3–0	0–1	—	1–1	1–2	1–1	0–0	0–1	1–1	5–1	4–3	1–3
Urawa Red Diamonds	1–0	0–0	3–1	0–2	0–0	0–3	1–2	0–1	0–4	—	2–2	1–0	1–1	0–1	2–1	6–0	1–2	0–2
Sagan Tosu	0–2	2–2	1–1	0–2	1–3	1–1	1–2	0–0	2–1	0–1	—	0–0	1–1	3–0	2–2	0–1	0–1	3–0
Sanfrecce Hiroshima	3–0	1–0	1–2	2–2	3–1	0–2	1–2	2–0	0–1	1–1	3–0	—	4–1	3–3	1–2	1–1	2–1	1–1
Shimizu S-Pulse	1–2	1–1	3–1	3–1	3–4	2–2	1–2	1–2	1–2	1–2	1–1	2–3	—	1–3	4–2	2–3	3–1	2–3
FC Tokyo	1–2	3–0	2–0	1–0	0–4	0–4	0–1	1–0	1–3	2–0	2–3	1–0	3–1	—	2–3	1–0	1–0	2–1
Oita Trinita	1–4	2–2	0–1	1–1	1–0	1–0	0–1	0–3	0–0	0–0	2–0	0–2	2–1	0–1	—	0–2	1–1	1–0
Vegalta Sendai	1–3	0–0	2–3	2–2	0–1	2–3	1–4	1–1	0–2	1–2	0–3	0–0	0–0	2–2	0–3	—	2–3	0–0
Vissel Kobe	1–3	0–2	0–1	4–0	3–3	2–2	0–2	1–0	2–3	0–1	4–3	0–3	3–1	2–2	1–1	1–2	—	1–1
Yokohama FC	1–0	4–2	1–2	1–2	3–1	1–5	0–2	3–2	0–3	0–2	1–1	0–2	1–3	1–0	2–3	1–1	2–1	—

Source: Meiji Yasuda J1 League
Legend: Blue = home team win; Yellow = draw; Red = away team win.

== Season statistics ==
=== Top scorers ===
Rank	Player	Club	Goals
1	(Kenya) Michael Olunga	Kashiwa Reysol	28
2	(Brazil) Everaldo	Kashima Antlers	18
3	(Brazil) Leandro Pereira	Sanfrecce Hiroshima	15
4	(Japan) Yu Kobayashi	Kawasaki Frontale	14
5	(Brazil) Erik	Yokohama F. Marinos	13
5	(Brazil) Júnior Santos	Yokohama F. Marinos	13
5	(Brazil) Leandro Damião	Kawasaki Frontale	13
5	(Japan) Kaoru Mitoma	Kawasaki Frontale	13
9	(Japan) Kyogo Furuhashi	Vissel Kobe	12
10	(Brazil) Leonardo	Urawa Red Diamonds	11
10	(Brazil) Marcos Júnior	Yokohama F. Marinos	11
10	(Japan) Akihiro Ienaga	Kawasaki Frontale	11

=== Hat-tricks ===
Player	Club	Against	Result	Date
(Kenya) Michael Olunga	Kashiwa Reysol	Vegalta Sendai	5–1 (H)	26 July 2020
(Brazil) Everaldo	Kashima Antlers	Oita Trinita	4–1 (A)	1 August 2020
(Japan) Naoki Maeda^{4}	Nagoya Grampus	Urawa Red Diamonds	6–2 (H)	8 August 2020
(Japan) Shun Nagasawa	Vegalta Sendai	Gamba Osaka	4–0 (A)	14 November 2020
(Brazil) Júnior Santos	Yokohama F. Marinos	Urawa Red Diamonds	6–2 (H)	14 November 2020
(Japan) Akihiro Ienaga	Kawasaki Frontale	Gamba Osaka	5–0 (H)	25 November 2020

- ^{4} Player scored 4 goals

== Attendances ==
Pos	Team	Total	High	Low	Average	Change
1	Kawasaki Frontale	77,587	21,117	0	6,466	−72.2%
2	Yokohama F. Marinos	90,196	34,521	0	6,443	−76.1%
3	Nagoya Grampus	67,997	11,854	0	6,182	−77.6%
4	Cerezo Osaka	72,310	15,535	0	6,026	−72.0%
5	Vissel Kobe	69,243	25,059	0	5,476	−74.5%
6	Urawa Red Diamonds	66,463	9,831	0	5,113	−85.0%
7	Gamba Osaka	47,042	9,313	0	4,863	−82.4%
8	Shimizu S-Pulse	55,698	17,549	0	4,642	−69.1%
9	Sanfrecce Hiroshima	50,669	18,713	0	4,606	−66.8%
10	Oita Trinita	54,196	8,570	0	4,516	−70.6%
11	FC Tokyo	53,887	8,166	0	4,491	−85.8%
12	Shonan Bellmare	48,734	13,071	0	4,430	−63.4%
13	Kashima Antlers	33,760	6,982	0	3,943	−80.8%
14	Sagan Tosu	40,780	8,574	0	3,722	−75.3%
15	Hokkaido Consadole Sapporo	47,111	5,359	2,039	3,624	−80.7%
16	Vegalta Sendai	36,113	13,968	0	3,611	−75.9%
17	Kashiwa Reysol	36,144	12,468	0	3,012	−68.2%^{†}
18	Yokohama FC	32,184	5,163	0	2,926	−58.6%^{†}
	League total	1,003,539	34,521	0	4,711	−77.3%

Updated to games played on 18 October 2020
Source: J. League Data
Notes:
^{†} Promoted from J2

== Awards ==
Award	Winner	Club
Manager of the Year	(Japan) Toru Oniki	Kawasaki Frontale
Most Valuable Player	(Kenya) Michael Olunga	Kashiwa Reysol
Rookie of the Year	(Japan) Ayumu Seko	Cerezo Osaka
Top Scorer	(Kenya) Michael Olunga	Kashiwa Reysol

J.League Best XI
Goalkeeper	(South Korea) Jung Sung-ryong (Kawasaki Frontale)			
Defence	(Brazil) Jesiel (Kawasaki Frontale)	(Japan) Shogo Taniguchi (Kawasaki Frontale)	(Japan) Kyohei Noborizato (Kawasaki Frontale)	(Japan) Miki Yamane (Kawasaki Frontale)
Midfield	(Japan) Akihiro Ienaga (Kawasaki Frontale)	(Japan) Ao Tanaka (Kawasaki Frontale)	(Japan) Kaoru Mitoma (Kawasaki Frontale)	(Japan) Hidemasa Morita (Kawasaki Frontale)
Attack	(Brazil) Everaldo (Kashima Antlers)		(Kenya) Michael Olunga (Kashiwa Reysol)	

2020 J1 League Best XI
