= Hiroshima Korean School =

North Korea-affiliated school in Japan

- 広島朝鮮初中高級学校 히로시마조선초중고급학교

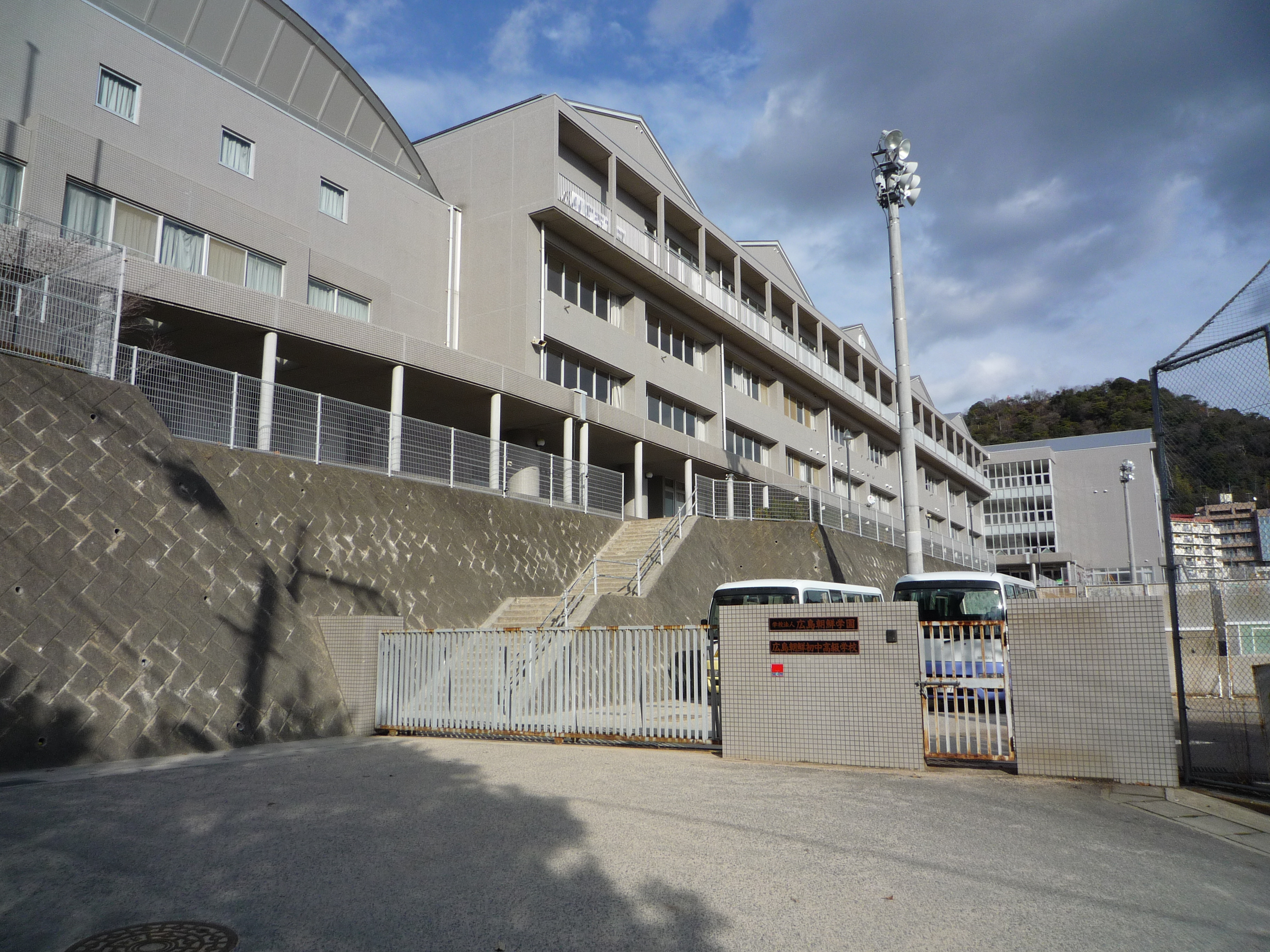
- Exterior of the school (2010)

Location
- 37-50 Yamane-chō, Higashi-ku; Hiroshima, Hiroshima, 732-0048; Japan; 34.4058°N 132.4812°E

Information
- Established: April 16, 1946; 80 years ago
- Website: hiroshima-corea.ed.jp

Hiroshima Korean School (広島朝鮮初中高級学校, Hiroshima Chōsen Shochūkōkyūgakkō; Korean: 히로시마조선초중고급학교; "Hiroshima Korean Elementary-Junior High-High School") is a North Korean international school in Higashi-ku, Hiroshima, Japan, serving elementary school through senior high school.

== See also ==
- Chōsen gakkō
