= Ibaraki Korean Primary, Middle and High School =

North Korea-affiliated school in Japan

- 茨城朝鮮初中高級学校 이바라기조선초중고급학교

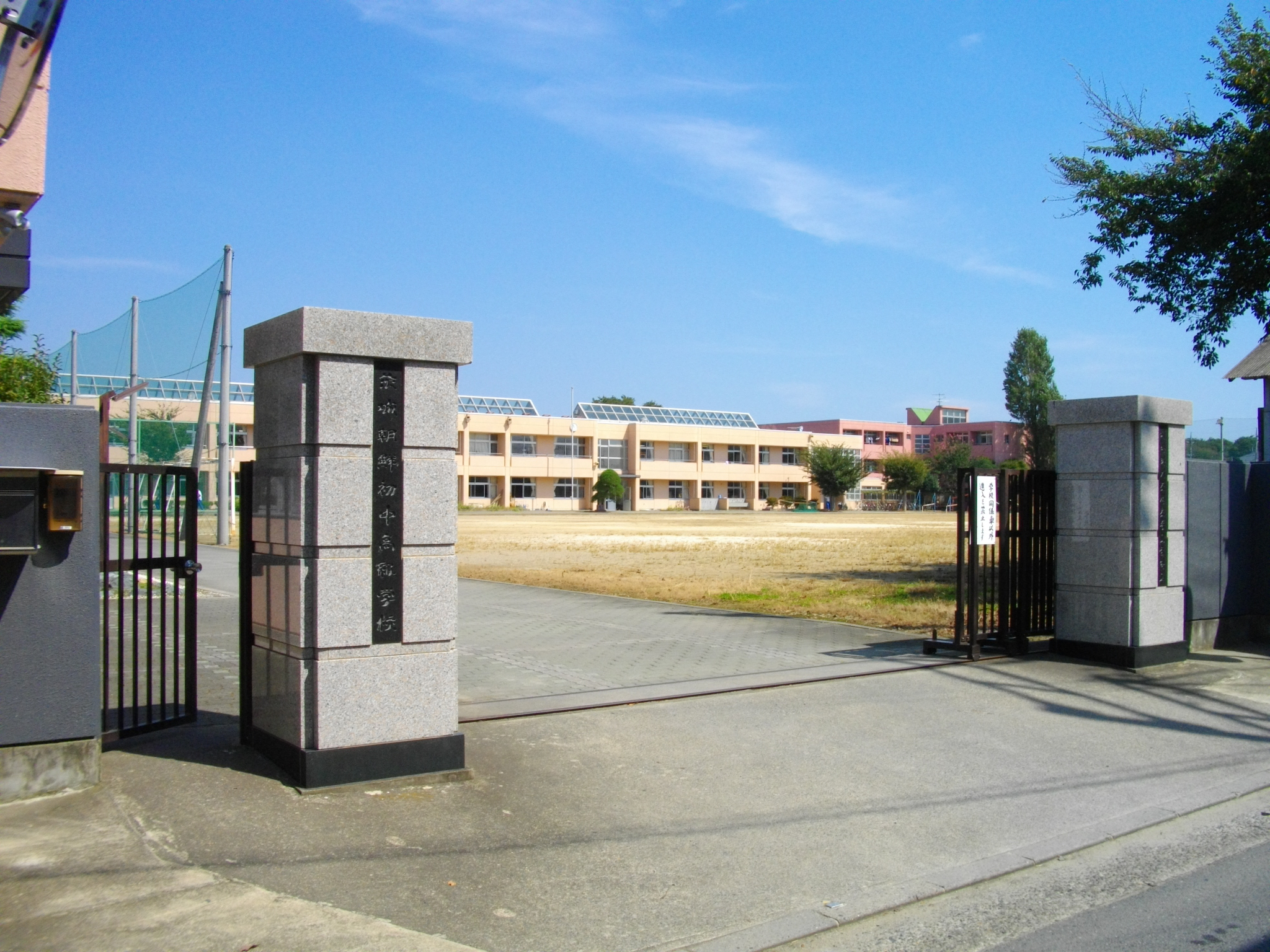
- The school building

Location
- 2846 Sembachō; Ibaraki Prefecture; Mito, 310-0851; Japan; 36.3566°N 140.4572°E

Information
- Type: Private Korean international school
- Established: 1953; 73 years ago
- School board: Ibaraki Korean Educational Foundation
- Grades: Primary through senior high school
- Website: ibaraki-korea.ed.jp

Ibaraki Korean Primary, Middle and High School (茨城朝鮮初中高級学校, Ibaraki Chōsen Shochūkōkyūgakkō; Korean: 이바라기조선초중고급학교) is a North Korean national school (chōsen gakkō) in Mito, Ibaraki, Japan.
