= Nannie B. Gaines =

American missionary

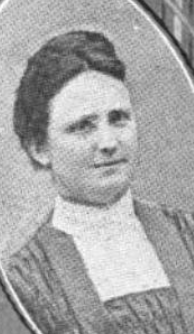
- Nannie B. Gaines, from a 1919 publication
- Born: Ann Elizabeth Gaines; April 23, 1860; Union County, Kentucky, U.S.
- Died: February 26, 1932 (age 71); Hiroshima, Japan
- Other names: Nannie Bett Gaines
- Occupation(s): Missionary, educator
- Known for: Principal of Hiroshima Jogakuin

Nannie B. Gaines (April 23, 1860 – February 26, 1932) was an American missionary teacher in Japan. She was head of Hiroshima Jogakuin, a Methodist girls' school in Hiroshima, for 45 years, beginning in 1887.

== Early life and education ==
Ann Elizabeth Gaines was born on a farm in Union County, Kentucky, the daughter of August (or Gustavus) Cooke Gaines and Catherine Mary Cromwell Gaines. Her father, a lawyer, died when she was a little girl, and her mother died in 1881. Her brother J. B. Gaines was a judge in Florida. She graduated from Franklin Female College in 1878.

== Career ==
Gaines taught at schools in Kentucky and Florida as a young woman. She moved to Hiroshima in 1887, as a missionary teacher under the auspices of the Methodist Episcopal Church, South (MECS). She began teaching at a girls' school organized by a Japanese Christian minister, Teikichi Sunamoto, and was the school's principal or principal emeritus for the rest of her life. She rebuilt the program after a typhoon and fire destroyed its buildings in 1891, and added a kindergarten program. In 1906, the school expanded and became an official girls' high school; it was described as "the largest mission school for girls" in Japan. In 1919, Gaines added a teacher training program, elevating the school to a college-level institution.

After she retired as principal emeritus, she left daily school work for missionary travels around Japan, Korea, and Taiwan. During a 1914 furlough in the United States, she persuaded her mission board in Nashville to fund an automobile for her work. In 1916 she was decorated by the Japanese government for her work. She supported the work of Michi Kawai and Umeko Tsuda with the YWCA in Japan. She had an audience with the Crown Prince in 1926, to discuss women's education.

== Publications ==
- "Japan: In the School" (1896)

== Personal life and legacy ==
Gaines' sister Rachel Cromwell Gaines joined her in Hiroshima in 1916, and the sisters taught and lived together on the school's campus. Gaines died in 1932, at the age of 71, in Hiroshima. Although her ashes were interred in Hiroshima, a memorial marker was also placed at the courthouse in Dixon, Kentucky.

A statue of Gaines was erected on the campus of her school, but it was removed and recycled as scrap metal during wartime. The school's buildings were destroyed and more than three hundred teachers and students were killed by the atomic bomb in 1945. Hiroshima Jogakuin University (HJU) reopened at a new location away from the city's center; it is still an educational institution for women as of 2024. Gaines Chapel, on the campus of HJU, is named in memory of Nannie B. Gaines.
