= Kyushu Korean Primary, Middle and High School =

North Korea-affiliated school in Japan

- 九州朝鮮初中高級学校 규슈조선초중고급학교

Location
- 3-5-1 Orio, Yahatanishi-ku; Kitakyushu, Fukuoka Prefecture, 807-0825; Japan; 33.8675°N 130.7121°E

Information
- Type: Private Korean international school
- Established: 1956; 70 years ago
- School board: Fukuoka Korean Educational Foundation
- Principal: 趙星來
- Grades: Kindergarten through senior high school

Kyushu Korean Primary, Middle and High School (九州朝鮮中高級学校, Kyūshū Chōsen Chūkōkyūgakkō; Korean: 규슈 조선 중고급학교) is a North Korean international school in Yahatanishi-ku, Kitakyūshū, Japan.

In April 2022, the school merged with Kitakyushu Korean Primary School to form Kyushu Korean Primary, Middle and High School.
