= Riuler =

Brazilian footballer (1998–2021)

Personal information
- Full name: Riuler de Oliveira Faustino
- Date of birth: 25 January 1998
- Place of birth: Bastos, Brazil
- Date of death: 23 November 2021 (aged 23)
- Place of death: Hiratsuka, Japan
- Height: 1.77 m (5 ft 10 in)
- Position: Midfielder

Youth career
- São Paulo
- 2013–2015: Coritiba
- 2015–2018: Athletico Paranaense
- 2018–2019: Internacional

Senior career*
Years	Team	Apps	(Gls)
2019	J.FC Miyazaki	5	(0)
2020–2021	Shonan Bellmare	3	(0)
2020	→ FC Osaka (loan)	0	(0)
Total		8	(0)

International career
2015	Brazil U17	7	(0)
- * Club domestic league appearances and goals

Riuler de Oliveira Faustino (25 January 1998 – 23 November 2021), commonly known as Riuler, was a Brazilian professional footballer who played as a midfielder.

== Death ==
Riuler died of a heart attack on 23 November 2021, aged 23. He had suffered acute congestive heart failure.

== Career statistics ==
=== Club ===
Notes
