= Chōsen gakkō =

North Korea–aligned schools in Japan

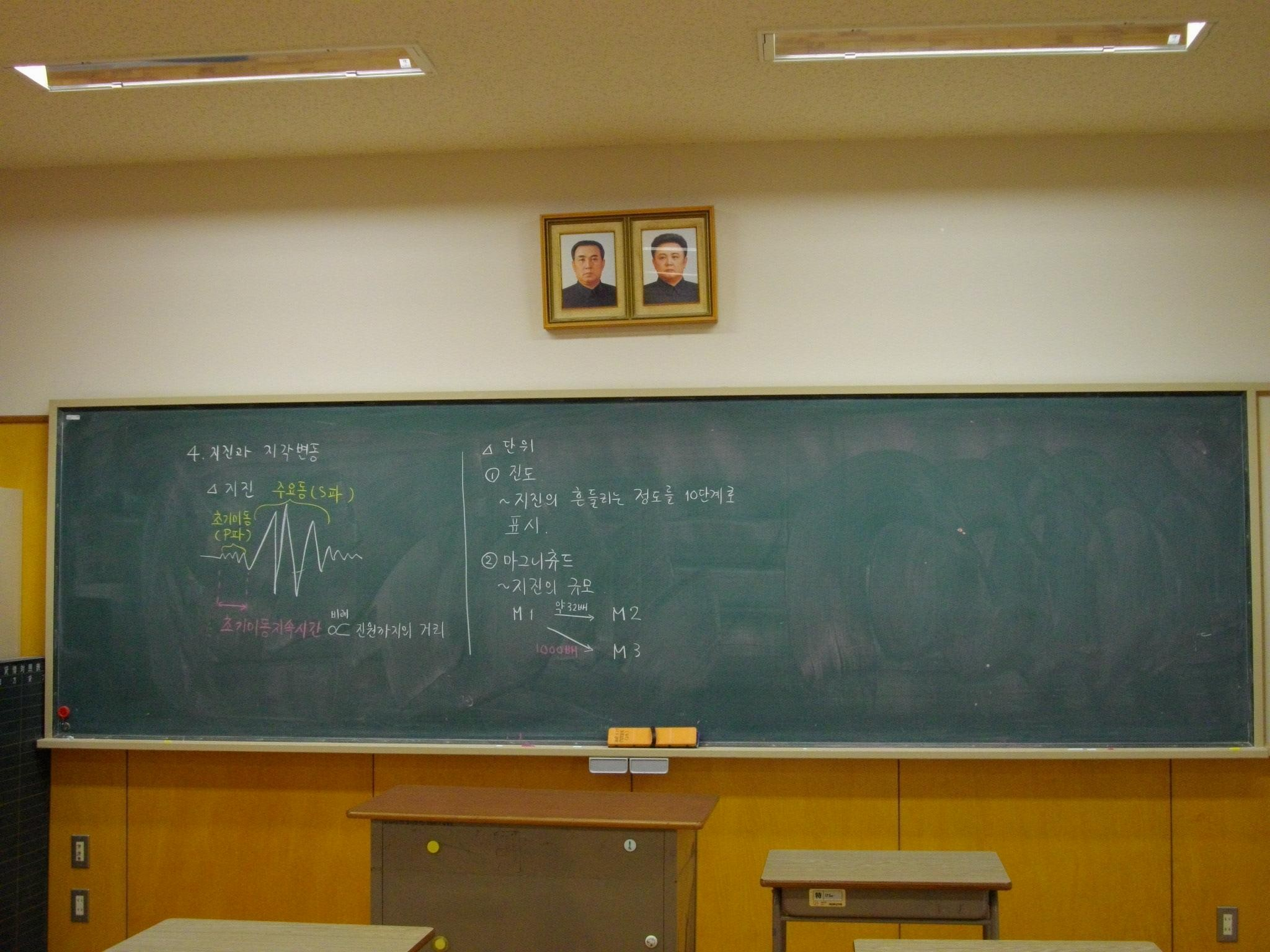
- Classroom at Tokyo Korean High School (東京朝鮮高級学校) with portraits of Kim Il-sung and Kim Jong-il

North Korean name
- Chosŏn'gŭl: 조선학교
- Hancha: 朝鮮學校
Transcriptions
- Revised Romanization: Joseon hakgyo
- McCune–Reischauer: Chosŏn hakkyo

Japanese name
- Kanji: 朝鮮学校
- Hiragana: ちょうせんがっこう

Chōsen gakkō (Japanese: 朝鮮学校; Korean: 조선학교; MR: Chosŏn hakkyo) are North Korean schools in Japan. "Chōsen" means Korean and "gakkō" means school. They are affiliated with the Chongryon (the General Association of Korean Residents in Japan) which has strong ties to North Korea. Sometimes Chōsen gakkō schools are referred to as Chongryon schools. They teach loyalty to the North Korean regime and hostility to the Western Bloc. Their students are born in Japan, but the lesson has a distinctive North Korean perspective. Japan has no control over the curriculum.

As of 2012, there were 135 Chōsen schools in Japan: 38 kindergartens, 54 elementary schools, 33 middle schools and 10 high schools, along with Korea University (not to be confused with Korea University in Seoul). As of 2014, there were about 150,000 Zainichi Koreans affiliated with the Chongryon in Japan, and they form the clientele of the schools. As of 2013, these schools had almost 9,000 ethnic Korean students.

The vast majority of Koreans in Japan do not attend Chōsen gakkō. For example, 87% of Koreans in Osaka attend wholly Japanese schools which make no provisions for bilingual education. They are distinct from Kankoku gakkō (한국학교, 韓國學校; 韓国学校, Hanguk hakgyo) which are overseas South Korean schools (재외한국학교, 在外韓國學校, 在外韓国学校, zaigai Kankoku gakkō/jaeoe Hanguk hakgyo) in Japan, which receive approval from the South Korean government and incorporate the South Korean educational curriculum and regular Japanese curriculum.

== History ==
=== Background ===
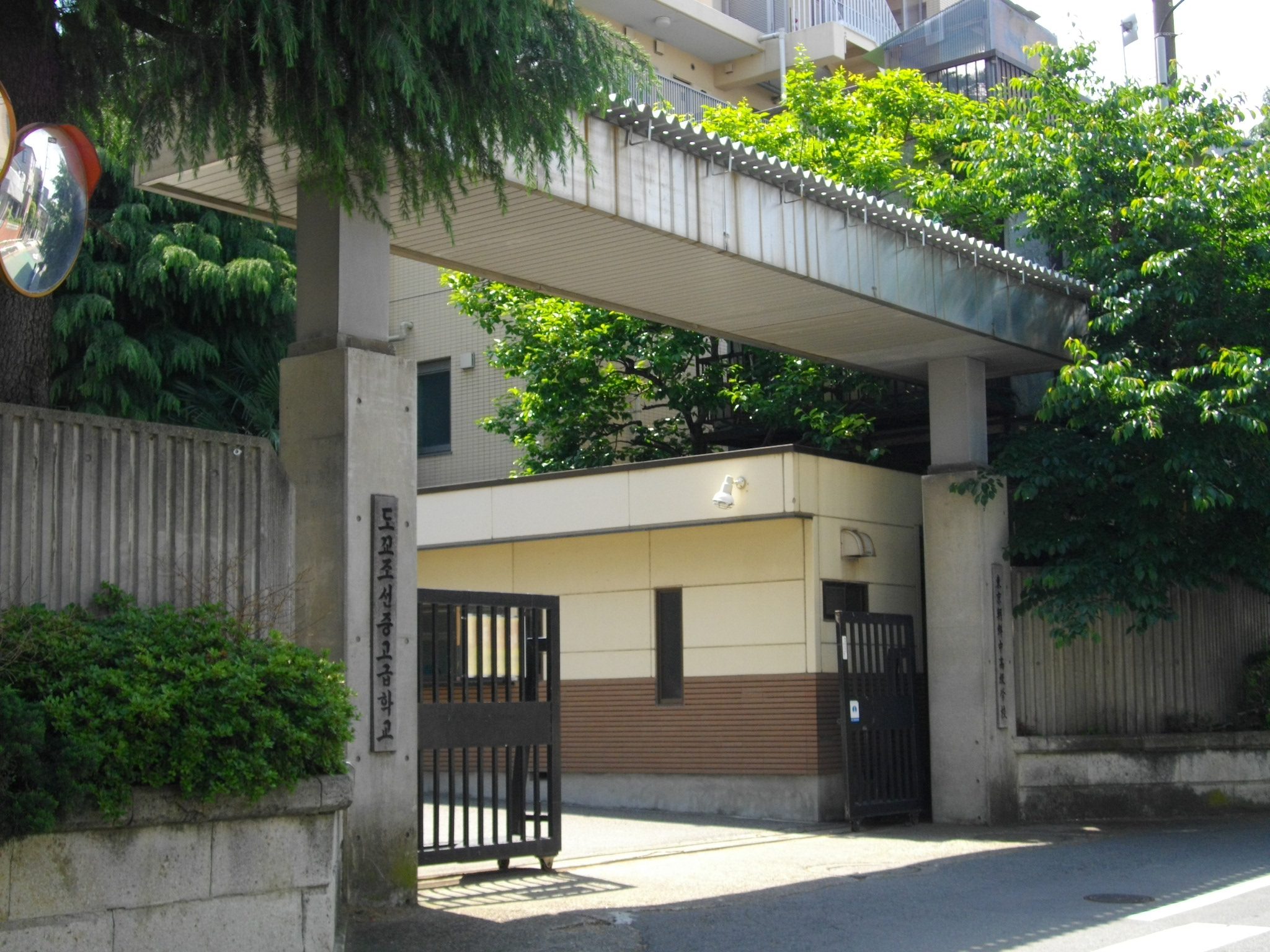
Tokyo Korean Junior and Senior High School (東京朝鮮中高級学校)

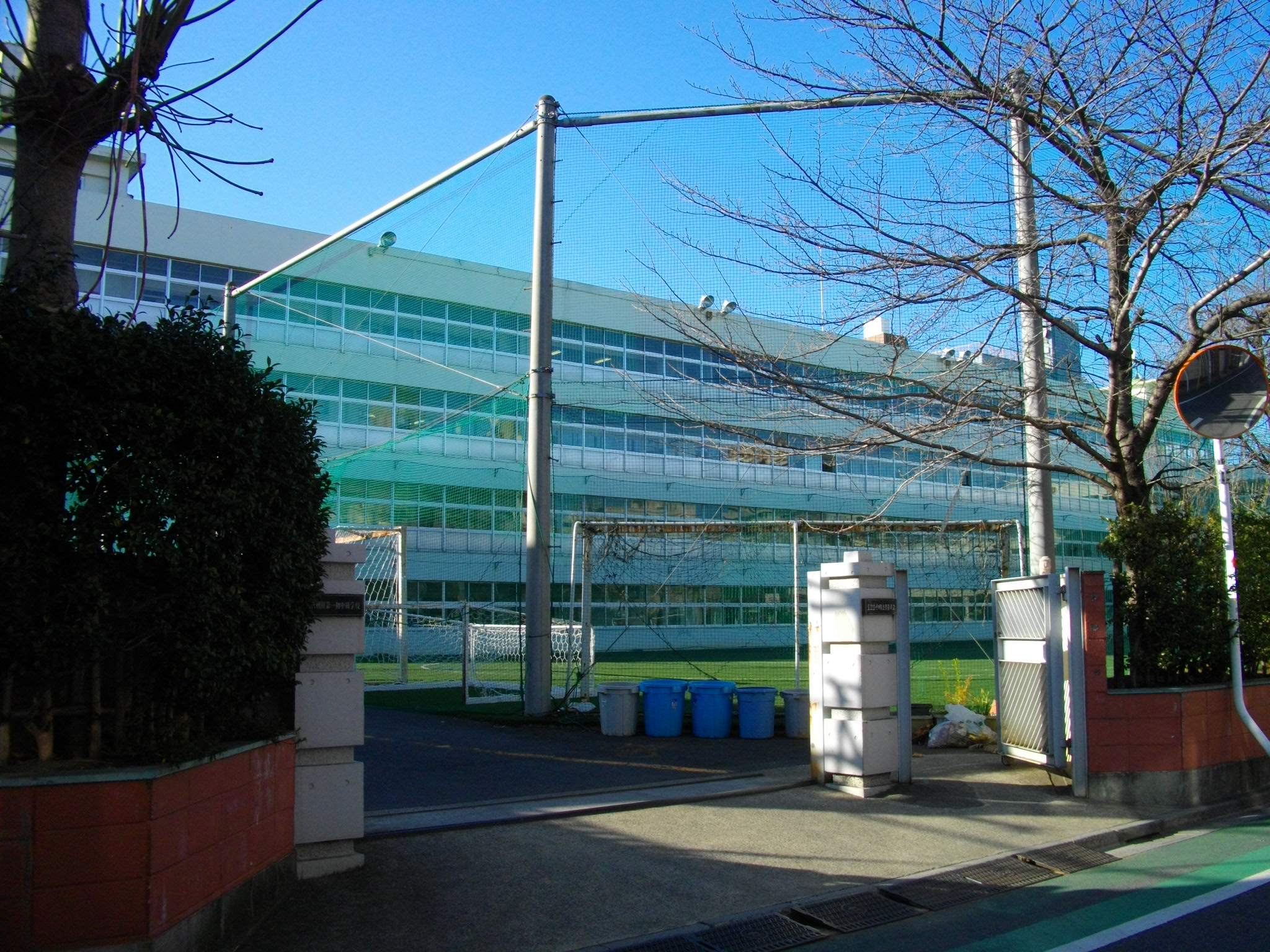
Tokyo Korean 1st Elementary and Junior High School (東京朝鮮第一初中級学校)

During the Japanese occupation of Korea between 1905 and 1945, many Koreans migrated to Japan, some by force and some voluntarily. The Japanese colonial government attempted to crush Korean identity, restricting the teaching and use of the Korean language both within Korea and Japan.

In the wake of the collapse of colonial rule in Korea in 1945, approximately two million Koreans had returned to their homeland, whilst approximately 600,000 remained in Japan.

Under the US occupation of Japan, ethnic Koreans were able to set up their own schools in which Korean culture could be taught and celebrated.

However, these schools soon faced restrictions. The American Occupation administration instructed the Japanese Ministry of Education to close Korean ethnic schools. Protests broke out. Clashes between the Japanese government and the ethnic Korean population peaked with the Hanshin Education Incident on 24 April 1948, in which 1,732 people were arrested. The same day, Japanese police went to Chōsen schools, forced out the students and nailed the doors shut.

In 1949, all Chōsen schools were closed.

=== Revival and relationship with North Korea ===
Set up in October 1945, the League of Koreans (also known as the Choryŏn) initially opened and operated the schools, until the organisation was disbanded due to its socialist ties in 1949. Then, after the Korean War armistice was signed, the Choryŏn was restarted under the new name Chongryon and they were able to reopen the schools.

Although the schools were reopened, their situation was still precarious. The only way for Chōsen schools to be both accredited and free of Japanese interference was to gain 'miscellaneous school' status, which is granted by local authorities, not the central Ministry of Education. After the Japanese government normalized relations with South Korea in 1965, it encouraged local authorities to deny miscellaneous status to North-affiliated Chōsen schools. Despite this, by 1975, all existing Chōsen schools had obtained miscellaneous school status.

The Chongryon has been labelled as North Korea's de-facto embassy in Japan. Various difficulties for Chōsen schools and Koreans in Japan arise from the Chongryon's links to Pyongyang.

In the immediate decades after the Korean War, North Korea far outstripped South Korea economically. As a growing industrial economy, North Korea funnelled funds through the Chongryon to finance Chōsen schools, along with parents paying tuition fees. In 2021, a press release from Pyongyang reported that, since the start of the Chōsen gakkō, North Korea had sent over ₩500 billion (US$437.08 million) of financial support.

=== Rise in anti-Korean sentiment ===
On 17 September 2002, the Japanese media reported that, back in the 1970s and 1980s, Japanese citizens had been abducted by the North Korean government.

In addition to North Korea's nuclear tests, the abductions resulted in a rise of anti-Korean sentiment. There were reports of Chōsen gakkō students being spat on, receiving verbal abuse, and having their distinctive uniforms slashed.

These attacks stoked fear amongst the Chongryon community. It became common practice to wear Western-style uniforms on the way to school and change into their Korean uniforms once they arrived. Each set of uniform cost ¥40,000 (US$364.46) so this protective measure represented a significant cost.

=== Japan withdraws tuition fee funding ===
In 2010, the Japanese Ministry of Education, Culture Sports, Science and Technology (MEXT) implemented the “Tuition Waiver and Tuition Support Fund Program for High School Education (Tuition Waiver Program)”. This new scheme would lessen the financial burden on families by making high school free for public, private, international and foreign schools. However, the decision was made to exclude schools affiliated with the Chongryon.

Tokyo Korean Junior and Senior High School charges ¥400,000 (US$3,644.65) per year to attend, which many Korean immigrants struggle to afford, so a tuition fee waver would make a big difference to poorer parents who have no choice but to send their children to Japanese schools.

In the 2011 fiscal year, the Osaka Prefectural Government ended subsidies to an educational corporation which operates ten Chōsen gakkō.

In February 2013, the Japanese central government, citing the development of the North Korean nuclear program and a lack of cooperation regarding the North Korean abductions of Japanese citizens, officially declared that Chōsen gakkō may not be a part of the tuition waiver program.

On May 17, 2013, the United Nations Economic and Social Council released a report citing "The Committee is concerned at the exclusion of Korean schools from the State party’s tuition-waiver programme for high school education, which constitutes discrimination".

By 2020, the Chongryon community had organised over 200 protests against the government's decision.

==== Legal challenges and school closures ====
Lawsuits have been launched throughout Japan against these unfair treatments against Chōsen gakkō students as discrimination based on ethnic origin and heritage.

In July 2017, the Osaka District Court ruled that the exclusion of Osaka Korean High School from the high school tuition fee waiver program was unlawful.

A few months later, the Tokyo District Court ruled against a Chōsen gakkō school, upholding the Japanese government's decision to withhold tuition subsidies.

The Supreme Court's ruled in August 2019 that it was lawful to exclude Tokyo Korean Junior and Senior High School, the largest Chōsen school in the country, from the scheme. The court cited the school's connections to Chongryon, amidst tensions with North Korea.

Higashiosaka Chōsen Chukyu gakkō closed in March 2018 due to "financial difficulties", according to a school spokesperson. In 2023, three more schools in the Osaka prefecture closed due to a lack of financial support from both Tokyo and Pyongyang.

=== Hate speech ===
In November 2019, former high ranking member of far-right group Zaitokukai was fined ¥500,000 (US$4,555.81) for calling Chōsen schools “spy training centers".

=== COVID-19 pandemic ===
At the beginning of the COVID-19 pandemic, when the Japanese government was distributing face masks to kindergartens, they chose not to distribute them to Chōsen gakkō. There was public outcry in South Korea, and the collective efforts of 10 civic groups resulted in donations of 1,500 masks and over ₩24 million (US$20,979.94).

=== 2023 investigations from Seoul authorities ===
In December 2023, the South Korean Ministry of Unification began investigating actor Kwon Hae-hyo, producer Cho Eun-seong and film director Kim Jee-woon for unauthorized contact with North Koreans after making a documentary highlighting discrimination in Chōsen schools.

Article 9 of the Inter-Korean Exchange and Cooperation Act states that South Korean citizens must notify the Ministry of Unification in advance if they intend to contact a citizen of North Korea, even if abroad. This legislation especially applies to those seeking to make contact with people linked to Chōsen schools that are affiliated with the Chongryon (the General Association of Korean Residents in Japan), which has ties to North Korea. However, if the person being contacted is a citizen of South Korea, no advance notification is required.

Cho Eun-seong stated, "in the past 10 years, I have made several documentaries related to Koreans in Japan and this is the first time something like this has happened."

The news of Seoul's investigations sparked outrage in Japan, with many fearing they could be suspected as a spy for simply speaking to someone North Korean. A restaurant owner, who is an ethnic Korean and third-generation immigrant in Japan, stated, "It’s perfectly natural for Koreans who have been in Japan for several generations to be on familiar terms with [North Koreans]. It’s certainly nothing to report to the authorities."

== Schools ==
- Aichi Prefecture
  - Aichi Korean Middle and High School (愛知朝鮮中高級学校)
  - Aichi No. 7 Korean Primary School (愛知朝鮮第七初級学校)
  - Nagoya Korean Primary School (名古屋朝鮮初級学校)
  - Toshun Korean Elementary School & Kindergarten (東春朝鮮初級学校) - Formerly had junior high school classes
- Chiba Prefecture
  - Chiba Korean Primary and Junior High School (千葉朝鮮初中級学校)
- Ehime Prefecture
  - Shikoku Korean Elementary and Junior High School (四国朝鮮初中級学校)
- Fukuoka Prefecture
  - Kyushu Korean Junior-Senior High School (九州朝鮮中高級学校)
  - Kitakyushu Korean Elementary School (北九州朝鮮初級学校)
  - Fukuoka Korean Elementary School (福岡朝鮮初級学校)
- Gifu Prefecture
  - Gifu Korean Elementary and Middle School (岐阜朝鮮初中級学校)
- Gunma Prefecture
  - Gunma Korean Elementary and Middle School (群馬朝鮮初中級学校)
- Hiroshima Prefecture
  - Hiroshima Korean School (広島朝鮮初中高級学校)
- Hokkaido
  - Hokkaido Korean Primary, Middle and High School (北海道朝鮮初中高級学校)
- Hyōgo Prefecture
  - Kobe Korean Senior High School (神戸朝鮮高級学校)
  - Kobe Korean Elementary and Junior High School (神戸朝鮮初中級学校)
  - West Kobe Korean Elementary School (西神戸朝鮮初級学校)
  - Amagasaki Korean Elementary and Middle School (尼崎朝鮮初中級学校)
  - Itami Korean Elementary School (伊丹朝鮮初級学校)
  - Seiban North Korean Elementary and Middle School (西播朝鮮初中級学校)
- Ibaraki Prefecture
  - Ibaraki Korean Primary, Middle and High School (茨城朝鮮初中高級学校)
- Kanagawa Prefecture
  - Kanagawa Korean Jr./ Sr. High School (神奈川朝鮮中高級学校)
  - Yokohama Korean Primary School (横浜朝鮮初級学校)
  - Kawasaki Korean Primary School (川崎朝鮮初級学校) - Formerly served junior high school
  - Nambu Korean Primary School (南武朝鮮初級学校) - Kawasaki
- Kyoto Prefecture
  - Kyoto Korean Junior High-High School (京都朝鮮中高級学校)
  - Kyoto Korean Elementary School (京都朝鮮初級学校)
  - Kyoto Korean No. 2 Elementary School (京都朝鮮第二初級学校) - Formerly served junior high school
- Mie Prefecture
  - Yokkaichi Korean Elementary and Middle School (四日市朝鮮初中級学校)
- Miyagi Prefecture
  - Tohoku Korean Primary and Junior High School (東北朝鮮初中級学校) - Formerly served high school students
- Nagano Prefecture
  - Nagano Korean Elementary and Junior High School (長野朝鮮初中級学校)
- Okayama Prefecture
  - Okayama Korean Elementary and Junior High School (岡山朝鮮初中級学校)
  - Okayama Korean Kindergarten (岡山朝鮮幼稚園)
- Osaka Prefecture
  - Osaka Korean Middle and High School (大阪朝鮮中高級学校)
  - North Osaka Korean Elementary School (北大阪朝鮮初級学校)
  - Osaka Korean Elementary School (大阪朝鮮初級学校)
  - South Osaka Korean Elementary School (南大阪朝鮮初級学校)
  - East Osaka Korean Elementary School (東大阪朝鮮初級学校)
- Saitama Prefecture
  - Saitama Korean Elementary and Middle School (埼玉朝鮮初中級学校)
- Shiga Prefecture
  - Shiga Korean Elementary School (滋賀朝鮮初級学校)
- Shizuoka Prefecture
  - Shizuoka Korean Elementary and Junior High School (静岡朝鮮初中級学校)
- Tochigi Prefecture
  - Tochigi Korean Primary and Junior High School (栃木朝鮮初中級学校)
- Tokyo
  - Tokyo Korean Junior and Senior High School (東京朝鮮中高級学校)
  - Tokyo Korean 1st Elementary and Junior High School (東京朝鮮第一初中級学校)
  - Tokyo Korean 2nd Elementary School (東京朝鮮第二初級学校)
  - Tokyo Korean 3rd Elementary School (東京朝鮮第三初級学校)
  - Tokyo Korean 4th Elementary and Junior High School (東京朝鮮第四初中級学校)
  - Tokyo Korean 5th Elementary and Junior High School (東京朝鮮第五初中級学校)
  - Tokyo Korean 6th Elementary School (東京朝鮮第六初級学校)
  - Tokyo Korean 9th Elementary School (東京朝鮮第九初級学校)
  - West Tokyo Korean No. 1 Elementary and Junior High School (西東京朝鮮第一初中級学校)
  - West Tokyo Korean No. 2 Elementary and Junior High School (西東京朝鮮第二初中級学校)
- Wakayama Prefecture
  - Wakayama Korean Elementary and Middle School (和歌山朝鮮初中級学校)
- Yamaguchi Prefecture
  - Yamaguchi Korean Elementary and Junior High School (山口朝鮮初中級学校)

=== Closed and/or merged schools ===
- Aichi Prefecture
  - Aichi Korean No. 9 Elementary School (愛知朝鮮第九初級学校)
  - Toyohashi Korean Primary School (豊橋朝鮮初級学校)
- Fukui Prefecture
  - Hokuriku Korean Elementary and Junior High School (北陸朝鮮初中級学校)
- Fukuoka Prefecture
  - Chikuho Korean Elementary School (筑豊朝鮮初級学校)
  - Kokura Korean Kindergarten (小倉朝鮮幼稚園) - Kitakyushu
- Fukushima Prefecture
  - Fukushima Korean School (福島朝鮮初中級学校)
- Gifu Prefecture
  - Tono Korean Elementary and Middle School (東濃朝鮮初中級学校) - Toki
- Hyōgo Prefecture
  - Akashi Korean Elementary School (明石朝鮮初級学校)
  - Amagasaki East Korean Elementary School (尼崎東朝鮮初級学校)
  - Hanshin Korean Elementary School (阪神朝鮮初級学校)
  - Takarazuka Korean Elementary School (宝塚朝鮮初級学校)
- Kanagawa Prefecture
  - Tsurumi Korean Primary School (鶴見朝鮮初級学校) - Yokohama
- Kyoto Prefecture
  - Maizuru Korean Elementary and Junior High School (舞鶴朝鮮初中級学校)
  - Kyoto Korean No. 1 Elementary School (京都朝鮮第一初級学校)
  - Kyoto Korean No. 3 Elementary School (京都朝鮮第三初級学校) - Merged/renamed to Kyoto Korean Elementary School
- Nara Prefecture
  - Nara Korean Elementary School (奈良朝鮮初級学校)
- Niigata Prefecture
  - Niigata Korean Elementary and Junior High School (新潟朝鮮初中級学校)
- Osaka Prefecture
  - Sakai Korean Elementary School (堺朝鮮初級学校)
  - Senshu Korean Elementary School (泉州朝鮮初級学校) - Izumiōtsu
  - West Osaka Korean Elementary School (西大阪朝鮮初級学校)
  - East Osaka Korean Middle School (東大阪朝鮮中級学校)
  - Middle Osaka Korean Elementary School (中大阪朝鮮初級学校)
  - Osaka Fukushima Korean Elementary School (大阪福島朝鮮初級学校)
  - Johoku Korean Elementary School (城北朝鮮初級学校)
  - Osaka Korean No. 4 Elementary School (大阪朝鮮第四初級学校)
- Saitama Prefecture
  - Saitama Korean Kindergarten (埼玉朝鮮幼稚園)
- Tokyo
  - Tokyo No. 8 Korean Elementary School (東京朝鮮第八初級学校)
- Yamaguchi Prefecture
  - Yamaguchi Korean High School (山口朝鮮高級学校)
  - Shimonoseki Korean Elementary and Junior High School (下関朝鮮初中級学校)
  - Ube Korean Elementary and Junior High School (宇部朝鮮初中級学校)
  - Tokuyama Korean Elementary and Junior High School (徳山朝鮮初中級学校)

== See also ==
- Our School
- Chinese independent high school - Ethnic centric education in Malaysia
- Miscellaneous school - Classification of chōsen gakkō by Japanese authorities
- Tokyo Korean School
