= Hiroshima Jogakuin University =

Coordinates: 34°24′47″N 132°29′01″E

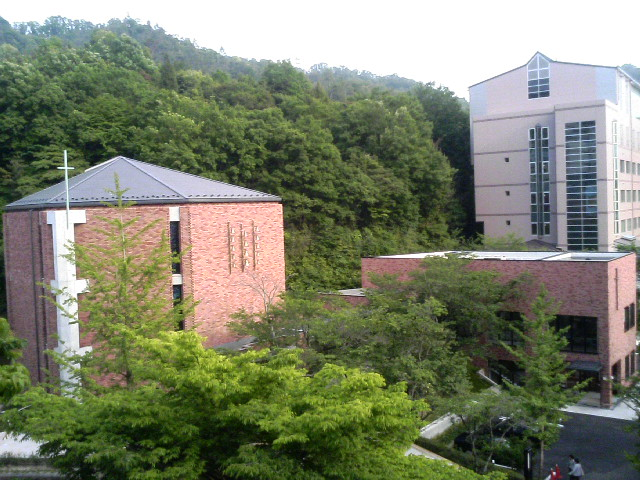
A chapel inside the campus.

Hiroshima Jogakuin University (広島女学院大学, Hiroshima jogakuin daigaku) is a private women's college in Ushita,Higashi-ku, Hiroshima, Japan. The predecessor of the school, Hiroshima Joggakai (広島女学会), was founded in 1886, and it was chartered as a university in 1949. The original school, when it was established in 1886, was the first school for women in the city of Hiroshima. The school's first building, built in 1892, was one of the earliest Western buildings in the Hiroshima region.

The university is affiliated with Hiroshima Jogakuin Junior and Senior High Schools.

It is scheduled to be renamed YIC Gakuin University and become coeducational in April 2027.
