= Tokyo Korean Junior and Senior High School =

North Korea-affiliated school in Japan

Coordinates: 35.7589°N 139.7183°E

- 東京朝鮮中高級学校 도꾜조선중고급학교

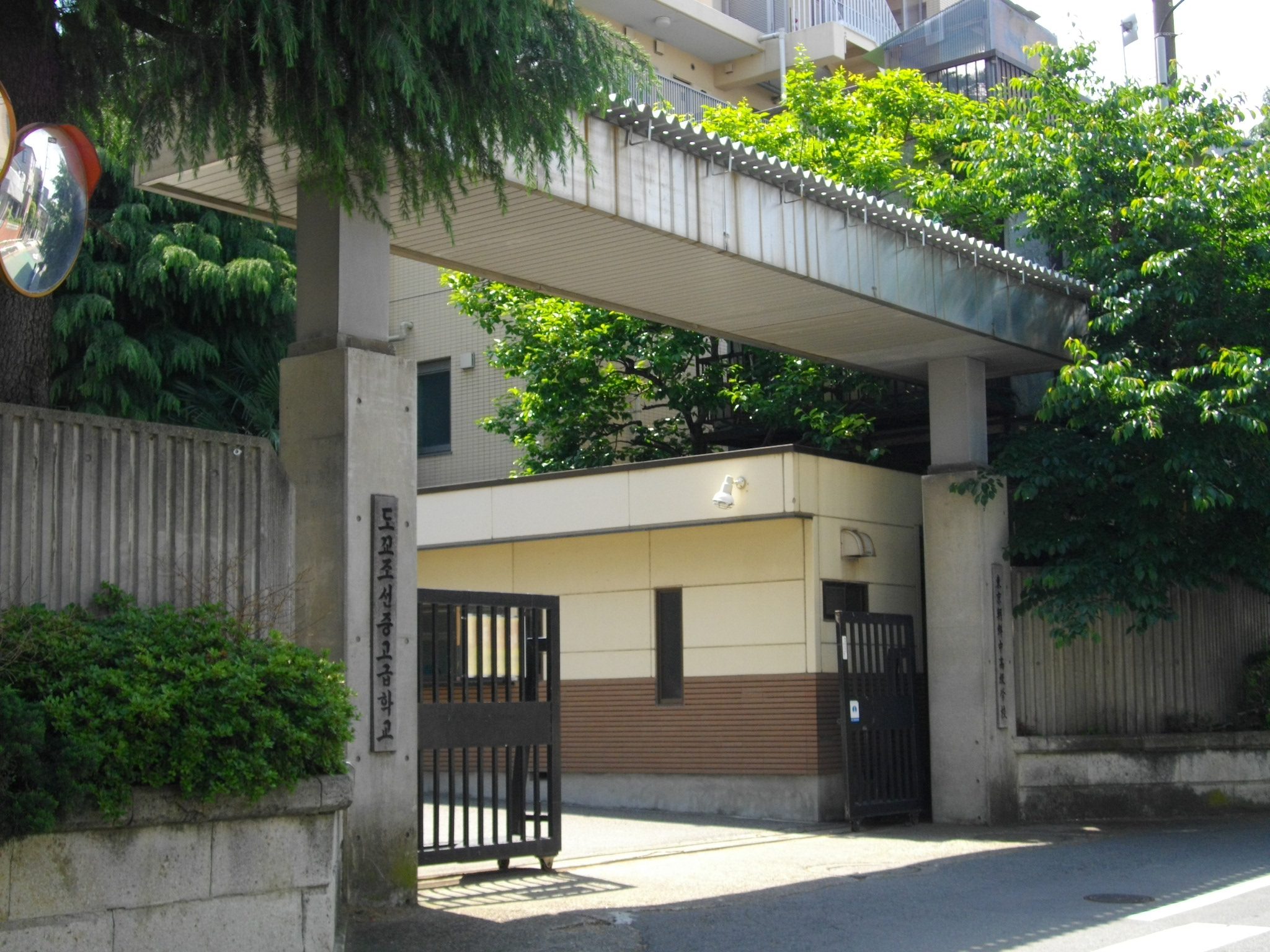
- The school in 2010

Location
- 2 Chome-6-32 Jūjōdai, Kita-ku, Tōkyō-to 114-0033 〒114-0033 東京都北区十条台2-6-32

Information
- Established: October 5, 1946; 80 years ago
- Website: t-korean.ed.jp

Tokyo Korean Junior and Senior High School

North Korean name
- Chosŏn'gŭl: 도꾜조선중고급학교
- Hancha: 도꾜朝鮮中高級學校
Transcriptions
- Revised Romanization: Dokkyo Joseon Junggogeup Hakgyo
- McCune–Reischauer: Tokkyo Chosŏn Chunggogŭp Hakkyo

Japanese name
- Kanji: 東京朝鮮中高級学校
- Hiragana: とうきょうちょうせんちゅうこうきゅうがっこう
Transcriptions
- Revised Hepburn: Tōkyō Chōsen Chūkōkyūgakkō

Tokyo Korean Middle and High School (東京朝鮮中高級学校, Tōkyō Chōsen Chūkōkyūgakkō; Korean: 도꾜조선중고급학교; Hanja: 東京朝鮮中高級學校; MR: Tokkyo Chosŏn Chunggogŭp Hakkyo) is a North Korea-aligned Korean international school in Jūjōdai (十条台), Kita-ku, Tokyo. As of 2013 it was one of ten North Korean-aligned high schools located in Japan. As of that year, Shin Gil-ung serves as the school's principal. It operates under the Chongryon. In 2014, Isabel Reynolds of Bloomberg News described the school as "large and relatively prosperous" compared to other North Korean international schools in Japan.

== History ==
The school opened on 5 October 1946 as a secondary school for Korean residents in Japan, and a senior-high division was added in 1948.

Historically the school received funding from the North Korean government and a six million yen ($63,000 US in 2013) subsidy every year from the Japanese government. Around 2011 the Japanese government made North Korea-aligned schools ineligible for tuition waivers. In 2013 the Japanese government announced that this school would no longer get subsidies. By that time funding from the North Korean government had sharply declined.

== Facility ==
The school uses gray buildings, one of which includes a clock. Isabel Reynolds of Bloomberg stated that the physical appearance of the school is similar to that of domestic Japanese schools.

== Curriculum ==
The school's curriculum is similar to that of most Japanese senior high schools. Modern history classes have their own course materials, while other classes use Korean translations of Japanese textbooks. Many female students take dance classes using Korean styles. Students in their senior (final) year take trips to North Korea.

In 2014 principal Shin Gil-ung stated "It’s up to the students to decide whether they support that political system. We avoid telling them that everything North Korea does is right."

== Operations ==
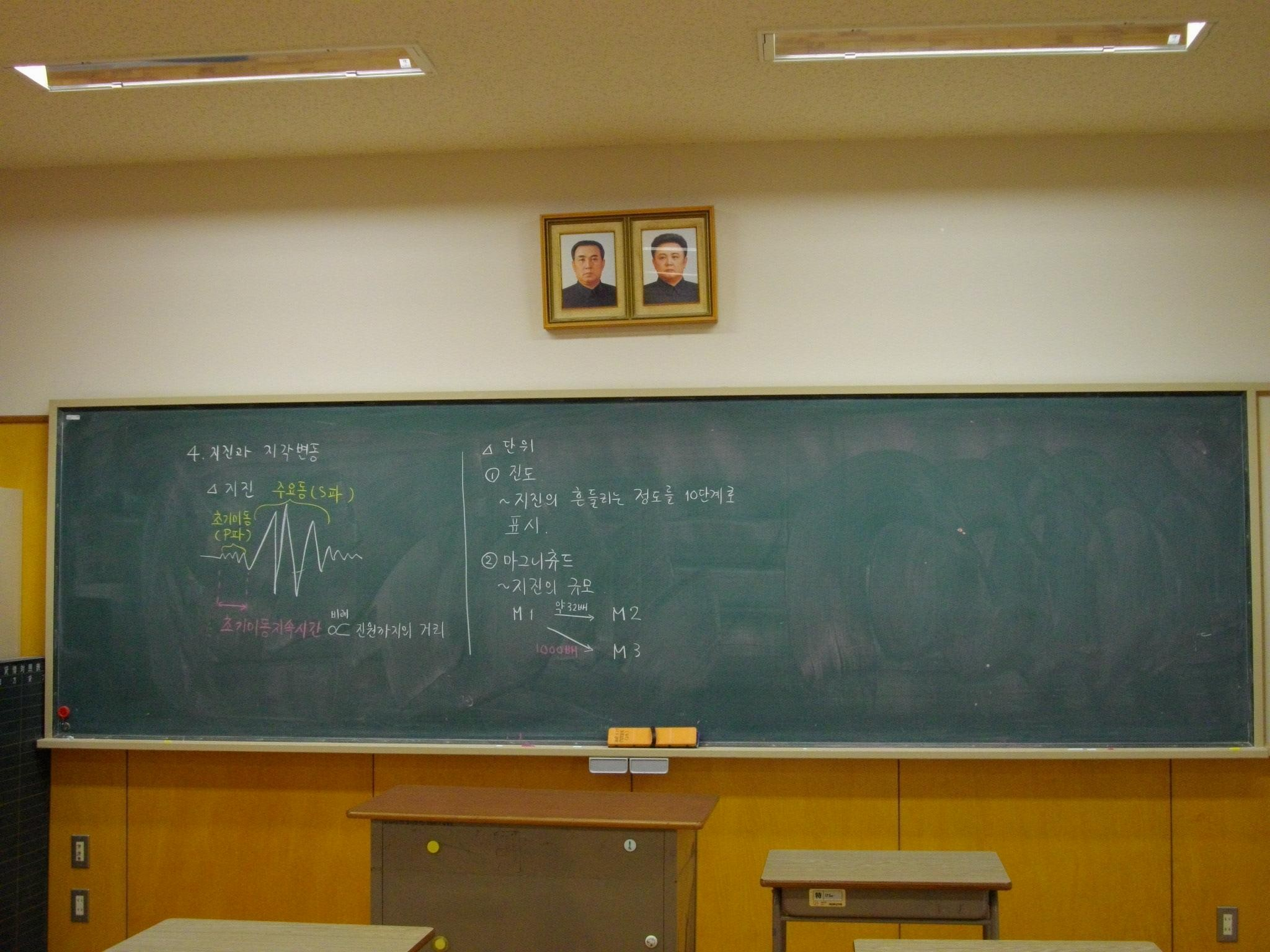
A science classroom at Tokyo Korean High School with photographs of Kim Il-sung and Kim Jong-il

The school uses the Korean language in its official notices, and the school discourages its students from speaking Japanese while on school grounds. As of 2013 all classrooms have photographs of Kim Il-sung and Kim Jong-il. Female students and teachers wear chima jeogori. The school serves Korean foods in its cafeteria. As of 2013 80% of the school's costs come from tuition and other expenses from the parents of the students.

== Student body ==
As of 2013 the school had 650 students. As of 2014 about 40% of the students who graduate from this school attend universities. The school's peak enrollment was in the late 1960s, with 2,300 students.

== See also ==
- List of high schools in Tokyo
- Chōsen gakkō
