= Russians in Japan =

Minority group in Japan

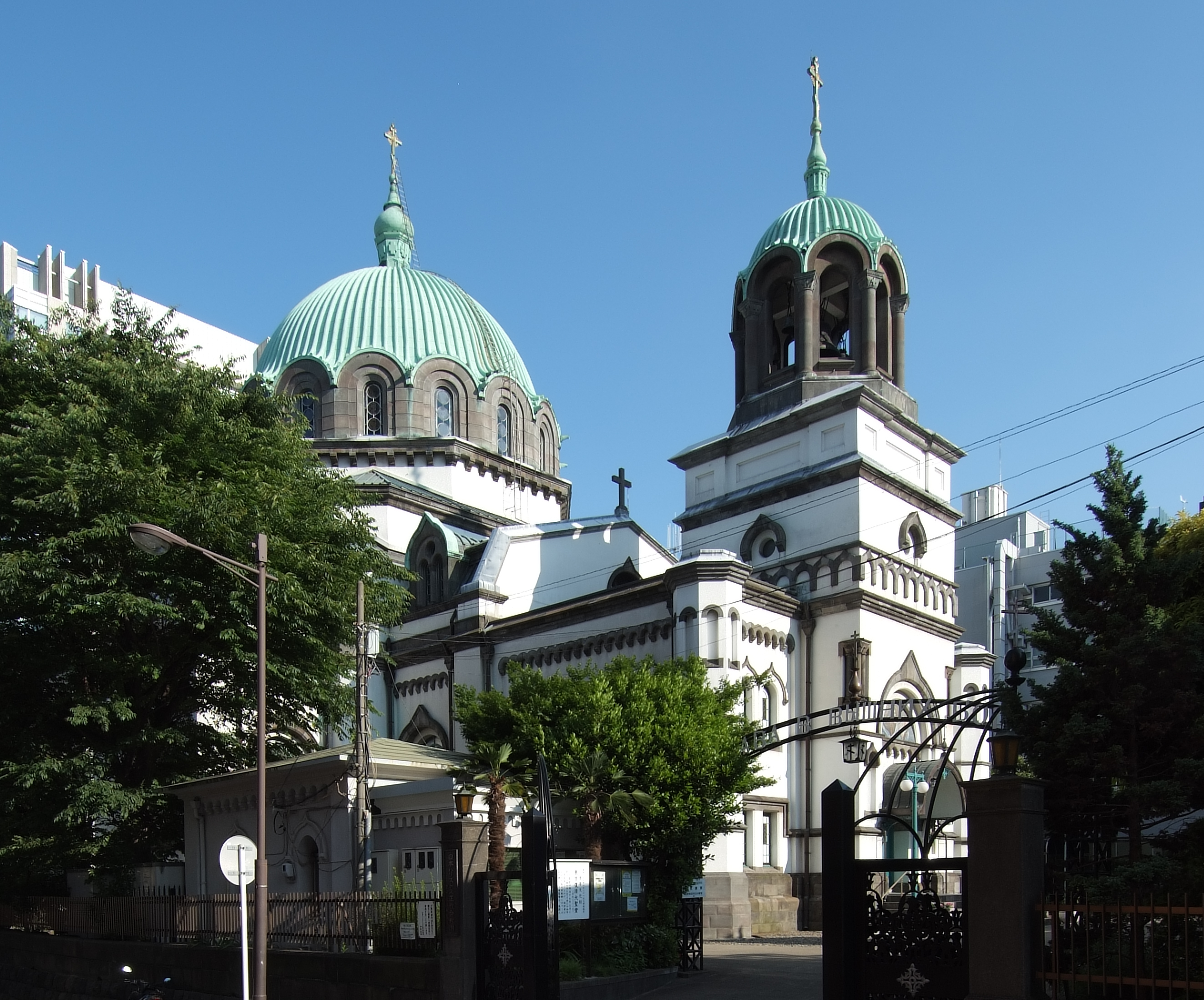
- The Holy Resurrection Cathedral in Tokyo, founded by a Russian Orthodox Christian priest

Total population
- 12,107 (in December 2024, only counting Russian citizens living in Japan)

Regions with significant populations
- Hakodate, Tokyo, Wakkanai, Kobe, Sapporo, Yokohama, Chiba

Languages
- Russian • Japanese

Religion
- Japanese Orthodox Church

Related ethnic groups
- Russians in Korea

Russians in Japan (Japanese: 在日ロシア人, Zai-Nichi Roshia-jin; Russian: Русские в Японии, romanized: Russkije v Japonii) comprises every ethnic Russian living in Japan. They are one of the largest ethnic minorities in Japan, as well as making up to the third largest foreign group from Europe. The first recorded landing of Russians in Japan was in 1739 in Kamogawa, Chiba during the times of Japanese seclusion of the Edo period, not counting landings in Hokkaidō, which was not under Japanese administration at this time. In the 18th century, Russians were sometimes called "Red-haired Ainu" in Japan.

As of July, 2025, there were 12,107 Russian citizens holding residency in Japan. According to Japan's Ministry of Justice, a majority of the Russian citizens residing in Japan are permanent residents.

== Russian missions ==
The Russian Mission, or Orthodox Church of Russia in Japan, dates from 1861. A hospital had been previously built at Hakodate for Russians and Japanese. Nikolai Kasatkin was attached to it as chaplain with a church near the hospital. The hospital was destroyed by fire, though the church remained and Kasatkin stayed as a missionary at Hakodate, where he baptized a number of Japanese.

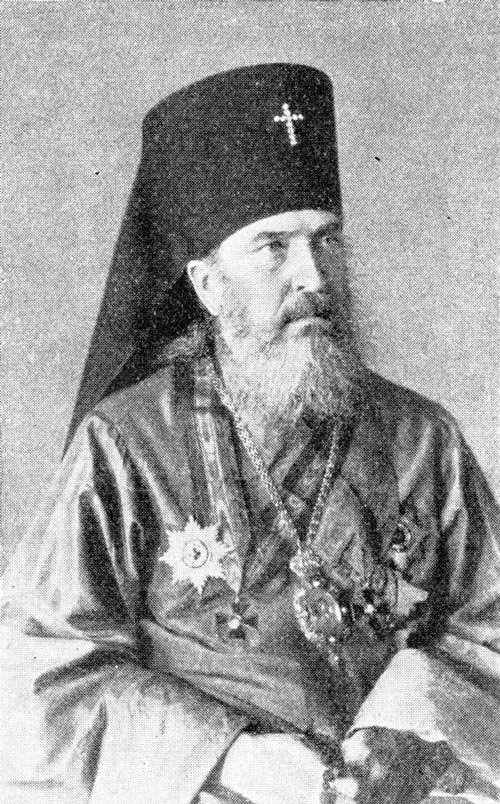
Nikolai Kasatkin

In 1870 the Russian minister to Japan obtained a grant of a special territory as a branch of the Russian legation at Surugadai at the very center of Tokyo. Here Kasatkin established his residence and the center of the Orthodox Church. He began by training well-instructed men and native assistants, for which purpose he had an ordinary college and a school of philosophy and theology; later on he also had a special school for young women. He preached his religion by means of carefully trained catechists and priests. From 1881 he also had a religious review, published twice monthly and a publication committee installed at his house published many books. In 1886, Kasatkin was consecrated bishop in Russia and in 1890 he completed the erection of his cathedral.

Kasatkin enjoyed a great personal esteem; he founded and governed everything pertaining to his mission. During the Russo-Japanese War the situation was very delicate, but the Christians, at least the greater number of them, did not abandon him. Even during this time he continued all his undertakings unmolested, his house being guarded by Japanese soldiers. Prior to that, he received from the Holy Synod 95,000 yen yearly, but during the Russo-Japanese War, these and other resources from Russia were greatly diminished, while on the other hand the price of everything in Japan increased. Kasatkin was compelled to diminish his expenses, to dismiss part of his staff and to exhort the Christians to contribute more generously to support their church.

After the victories of the Japanese over the Russian armies, the Christians leaders, after having agreed among themselves, declared to Kasatkin their intention to support themselves, independent of Russia. As Russia has its national church they wished to have also their Japanese National Church.

Little has been written concerning the work of the Russians in Japan; even in Russia, virtually no literature has been published in the matter. According to one Protestant reckoning, the Orthodox church numbered 30,166 baptized Christians; according to another only 13,000 (the last figure denotes perhaps practicing members). There were 37 native priests and 139 catechists. Expenses for church and evangelization in 1907 amounted to 55,279 yen; contributions of Christians, 10,711 yen; Churches or places of preaching, 265. Among the Russians, as among Protestants, and everywhere throughout Japan, the tendency was toward independence.

== Russian Revolution ==
The Japan-Russia border was a major gateway for Russian Emigres to enter Japan

The Russian Socialist Revolution of 1917 triggered an unprecedented wave of mass migration, particularly among the Russian bourgeoisie and intelligentsia, who sought refuge in Europe, the US, and parts of Asia, notably China and Japan. While some of these migrants eventually returned to the Soviet Union, most established themselves in their new countries. Despite its relatively small size, the Russian diaspora in Japan had a significant impact on the nation's economic and cultural spheres. Notably, most Russian migrants in Japan came from the "lower classes" of Imperial Russia. Lacking substantial support from international or local organizations, they were compelled to rely on their own resourcefulness. Many of these migrants, endowed with artistic talents and resilient personalities, made notable contributions to Japan's cultural heritage, highlighting the Russian diaspora in Japan as a compelling subject for study. Traditionally these refugees have been known as White Russians, with the corresponding Japanese term being Hakkei-Roshiajin, a term which has been applied to all former residents of the former Russian Empire. Initially the majority of Russians lived in Tokyo and Yokohama. After the Great Kantō earthquake of 1923 a significant number of them moved to Kobe.

A white émigré family is depicted in the novel The Makioka Sisters by Japanese author Junichiro Tanizaki.

== Historical connections with Hokkaido ==
The city of Hakodate in Hokkaido shares a unique historical connection with Russia. During the Meiji period's Wild West frontier days, Russia played a significant role in shaping Hakodate, establishing one of the first foreign consulates after Japan opened its borders in the early 1860s. To honor this bond, the Hakodate Russian Festival has been celebrated since 1994, hosted annually by the Far Eastern Federal University Hakodate Campus. A highlight of the festival is Maslenitsa, a Russian Orthodox tradition marking the onset of Lent. Visitors can also enjoy activities such as a ‘Russian Café,’ introductory Russian language classes, and a chess-playing session. As mentioned earlier, the Far Eastern Federal University has a campus in Hakodate, which serves to promote Russian culture in the area, also attracts Russian students from Vladivostok to study there.

Similarly, two buildings in Hakodate built by Russians still stand at the centre of this city today. The Old Russian Consulate served as a consulate of the Russian Empire in the port city of Hakodate and the first foreign consulate in Japan. Within reach sits the Russian-built Hakodate Orthodox Church, again the first Eastern Orthodox church in the country that serves as a place of worship for local and Russian christians.

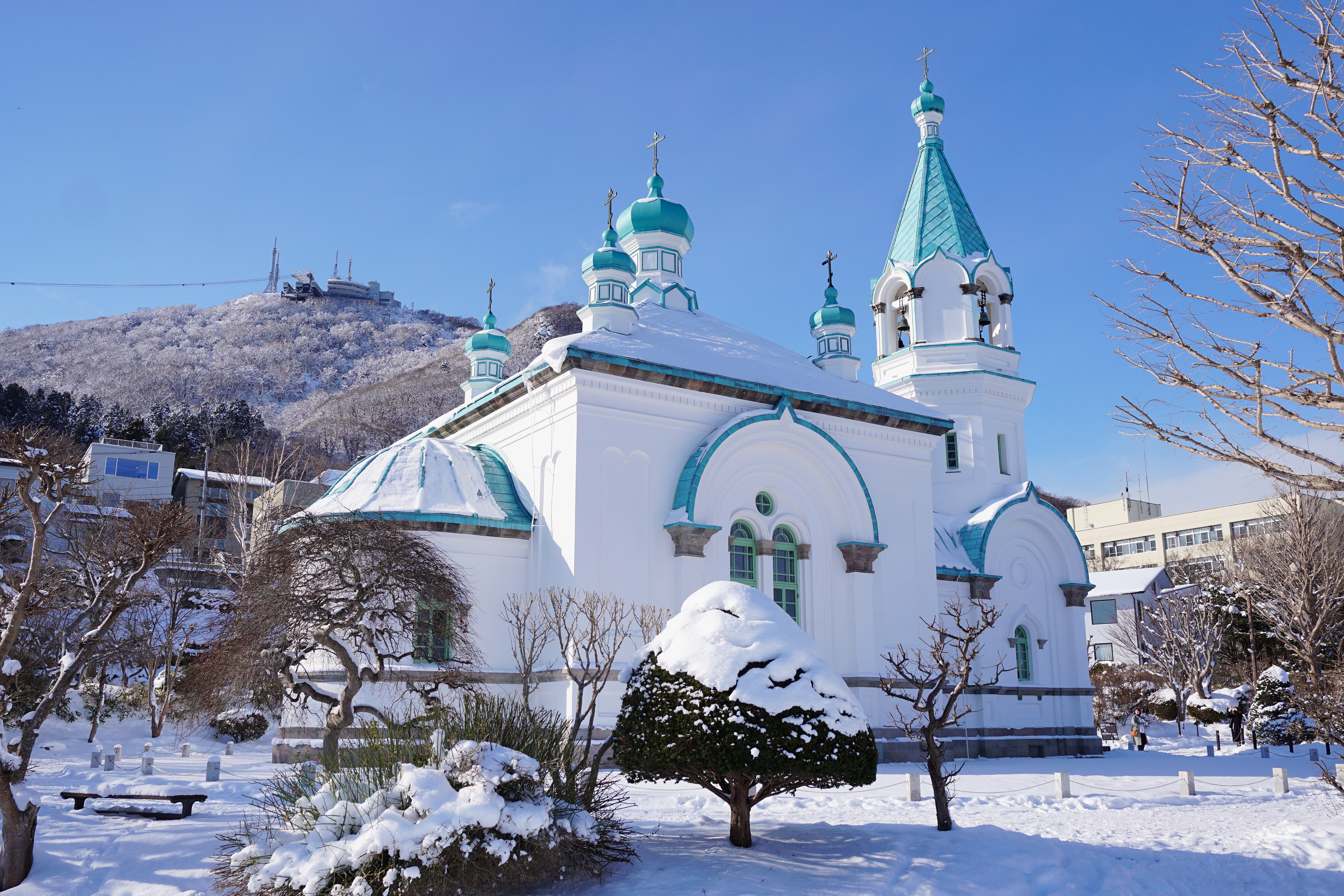
Hakodate Orthodox Church

== Contemporary Japan ==
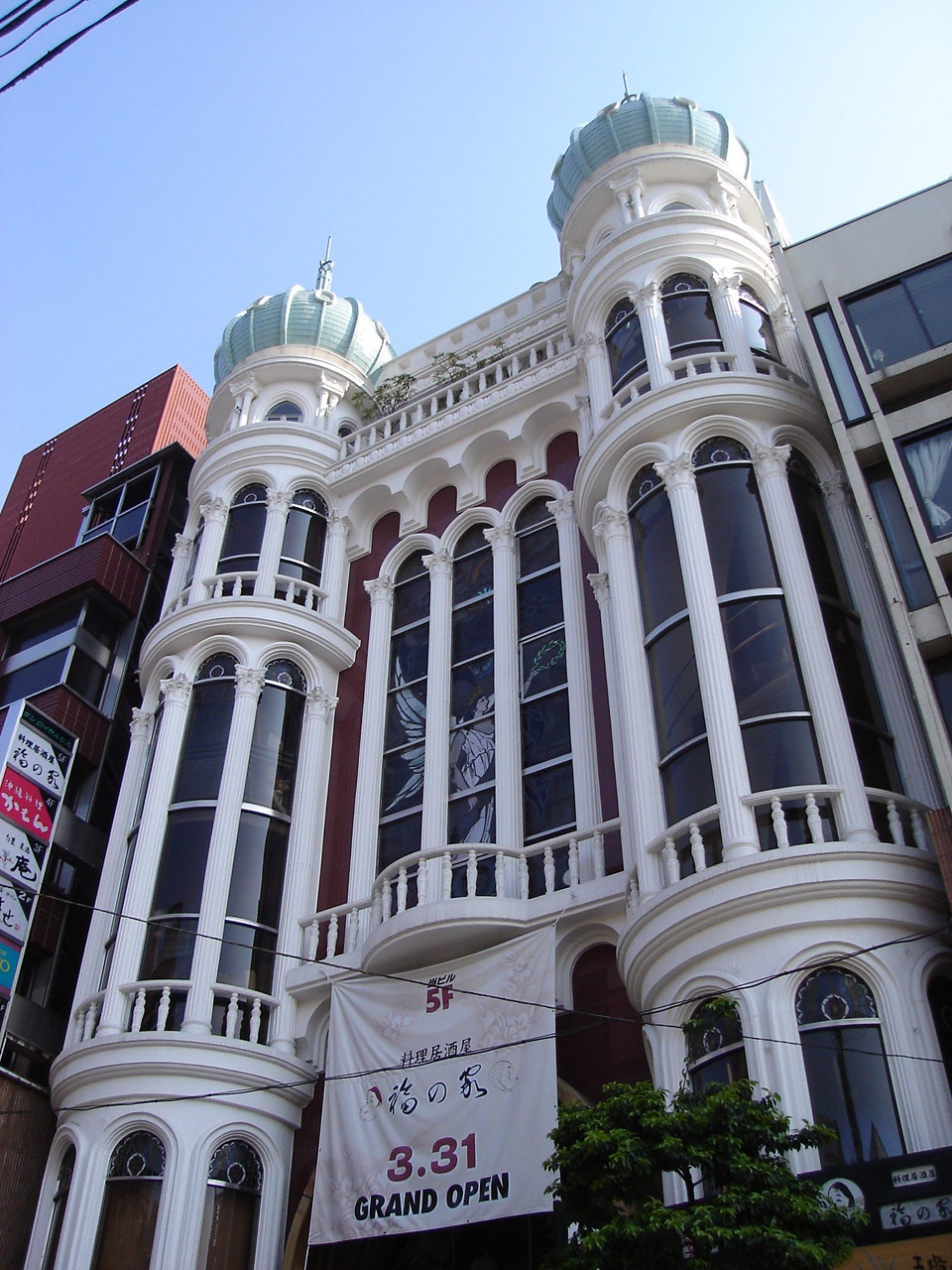
The site of a former Russian school in Tokyo, now used as commercial space

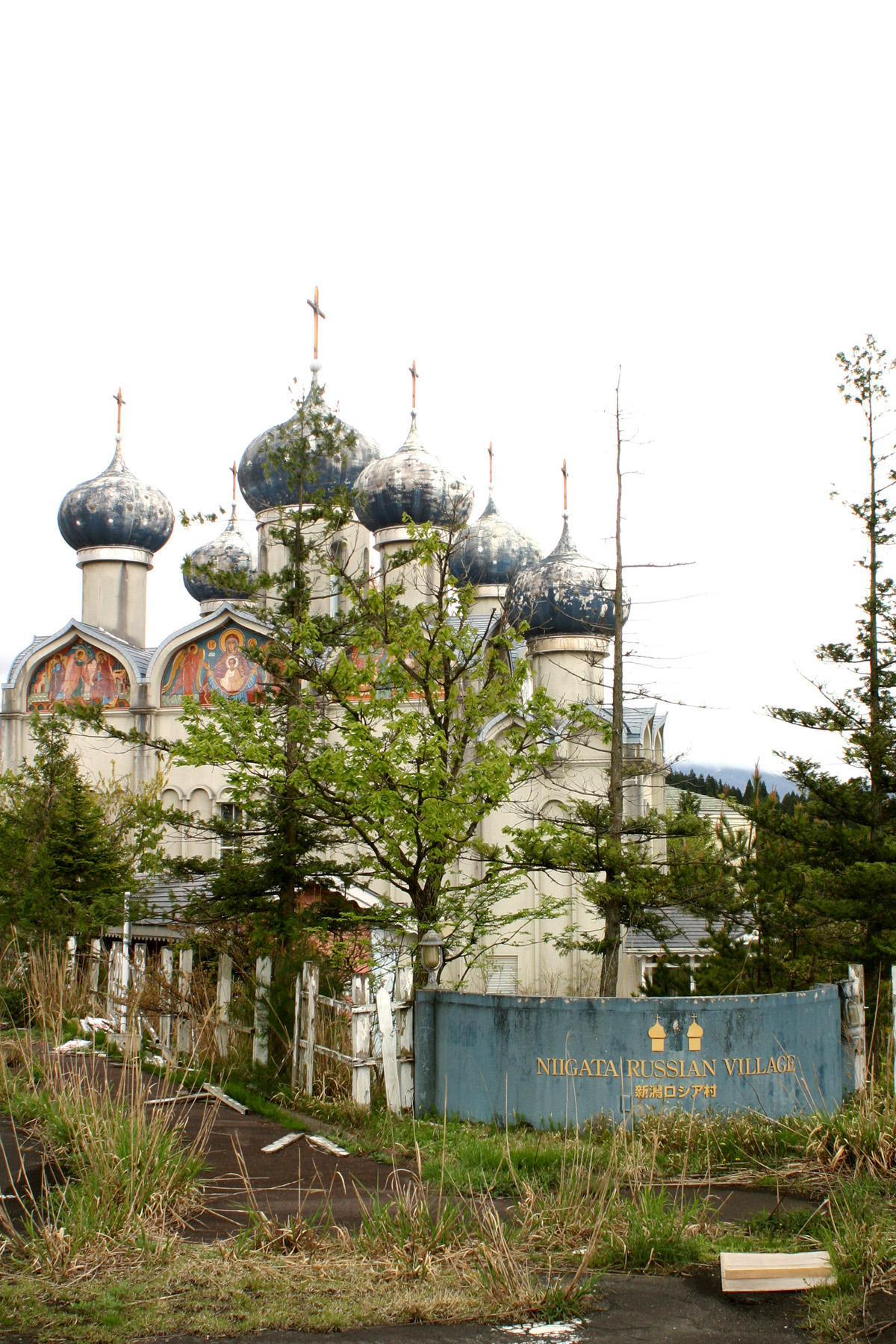
Niigata Russian Village, an abandoned theme park in Niigata, Japan

As of 2006, the statistics of Japanese government reported 39,000 Russians enter Japan yearly on average, not counting temporary landing permits of seamen and tourists. The number of Russians that stay in Japan longer than 90 days (the maximal duration of a temporary visa in Japan) is about 6,000. The Russian Embassy School in Tokyo serves Russian diplomat families in Tokyo.

== Racism ==
There were reports of Japanese men and women targeting against Russian citizens living in Japan and harassing them. One shop at least was slandered online and kept getting silent phone calls. Around 89% of the Japanese population sees Russia between very to somewhat unfavourably, which is the second highest in the world after Ukraine. These discrimination and harassment against Russian residents residing in Japan became especially worse after the 2022 Russian invasion of Ukraine. Up until 2012, Japan was the country that saw Russians unfavourably the most ever surveyed with 72% of Japanese citizens voting for Russia as unfavourable.

== Notable people ==
- Anna Murashige
- Akiko Yano
- Ayako Fujitani
- Iori Kimura
- Ippey Shinozuka
- Jenya
- Junko Asahina
- Kaori Kawamura
- Koji Ota
- Maomi Yuki
- Miwako Kakei
- Noboru Sugai
- Nicholas of Japan
- Nicole Fujita
- Nikita Moiseev
- Ōhō Kōnosuke
- Rurika Yokoyama
- Rina Ota
- Ryuju Hino
- Taihō Kōki
- Victor Starffin
- Yukio Naya
- Yukiyoshi Ozawa

=== Fictional people ===
- Victor Nikiforov and Yuri Plisetsky, two Russian characters from Yuri on Ice
- Simon Brezhnev and Vorona from Durarara!!
- Erast Fandorin, from Boris Akunin's novels, described as the Russian Vice-Consul in Yokohama.
- Lev Haiba, a half-Russian, half-Japanese character from Haikyu!!
- Anastasia from The Idolmaster Cinderella Girls
- Eli Ayase, is a quarter Russian from Love Live! School Idol Project
- Meiko Honma from Anohana
- Alisa and Maria Mikhailovna Kujou from Alya Sometimes Hides Her Feelings in Russian
- Klara from Girls und Panzer

== See also ==
- Japan–Russia relations
- Nikolay Rezanov, the first Russian ambassador in Japan
- Ethnic groups of Japan
- Russians in China
- Shanghai Russians
- Russians in Korea
- Old Russian Consulate in Hakodate
- Harbin Russians
- Japanese Orthodox church
- White émigrés
- Japanese people in Russia
