= Junji Yayoshi =

Japanese guitarist and record producer (1968–2018)

Junji Yayoshi 弥吉 淳二
- Born: 17 May 1968; Fukuoka Prefecture, Japan
- Died: 26 January 2018 (aged 49)
- Genres: J-pop; rock
- Occupations: Guitarist; composer; arranger; record producer
- Instrument: Guitar
- Years active: 1994–2018

Junji Yayoshi (弥吉 淳二, Yayoshi Junji; 17 May 1968 – 26 January 2018) was a Japanese guitarist and record producer.

== Biography ==
He was a former member of the music unit stereo criminals. (Note: Their old band name was AXXL) After the dissolution of the unit, he made a full-scale start of activities as a guitarist, provided, arranged, and produced his music to other artists. He was a support guitarist for Kōji Kikkawa and aiko, and also worked for them as an arranger.

He served as the second generation guitarist of the back band Gyakutai Glycogen of singer-songwriter Ringo Sheena, whom he married in November 2000 (announced in January 2001). They divorced in January 2002.

In 1999, he co-produced Kaori Kawamura's solo project "Sorrow" which resumed her music activities.

From 2009 to 2010, he produced a single and album for Shunsuke Kiyokiba, in which he helped in making the rock sounds.

He died at hospital due to illness at 21:31 on 26 January 2018. He was 49. According to Yahyoshi's affiliation office, he had been fighting illness for about two and a half years until his death, but said he was not releasing the details of his illness.

== Works, arrangements, productions ==
- A Flood of Circle – "Best Ride," "Hana" (arrangement-production)
- Kana Uemura "Taisetsu na Hito" recorded track "Ashioto" (arrangement)
- Catsuomaticdeath (production)
- Kaori Kawamura (Sorrow) – Sorrow, Macaroni (work-arrangement, production)
- Shunsuke Kiyokiba – "Jet," "Mahō no Kotoba," "Ale," "Kawaranai Koto," "again," Rock & Soul (arrangement-production)
- Cool Joke – "Undo" (arrangement)
- go!go!vanillas – Kameleon Lights recorded tracks "Bilin Girl," "Counter Action" (arrangement-production)
- Hiroya Komeiji (arrangement-production)
- Maika Shiratori (joint work-arrangement, co-production)
- Strange Nude Cult – "Sorairo no Finale/Hana o Kau" (arrangement-production)
- Naomi Tamura – "Casablanca Dandy" (Kenji Sawada cover. Joint with Hitoshi Takaba)
- Tsubaki – "Style," "Hanabi" (co-composition, production)
- Shintaro Hazama – Bourbon Street, Simple Man (production)
- Maria (arrangement)
- melody. – "Haruka" (arrangement)

== Support ==
- aiko
- Mao Abe
- Kaori Kawamura
- Kōji Kikkawa
- Shunsuke Kiyokiba
- Hiroya Komeiji
- Ringo Sheena
- Maika Shiratori
- Naomi Tamura
- Lost in Time
