= Yamashita Rin =

Japanese artist (1857–1939)

- 山下りん
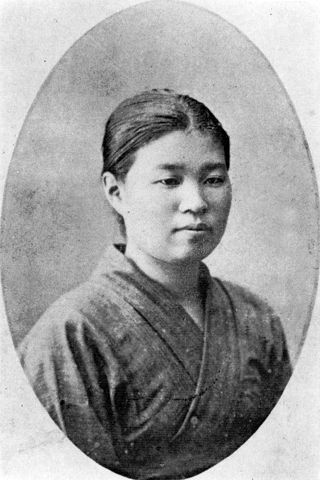
- Yamashita Rin aged 26
- Born: June 16, 1857; Kasama Domain, Hitachi Province, Japan
- Died: January 26, 1939 (aged 81); Kasama, Ibaraki Prefecture, Japan
- Occupations: iconographer, painter
- Known for: Orthodox iconography
- Notable work: Icons for the Japanese Orthodox Church
- Style: Academicism
- Movement: Orthodox iconography
- Patrons: Nicholas of Japan

Yamashita Rin (山下りん; June 16, 1857 – January 26, 1939) was a painter of icons for the Japanese Orthodox Church. She was one of the first independent Japanese female artists, the first recognized female yōga painter. She studied in Russia, and her work can be found in over forty churches across Japan.

== Life ==
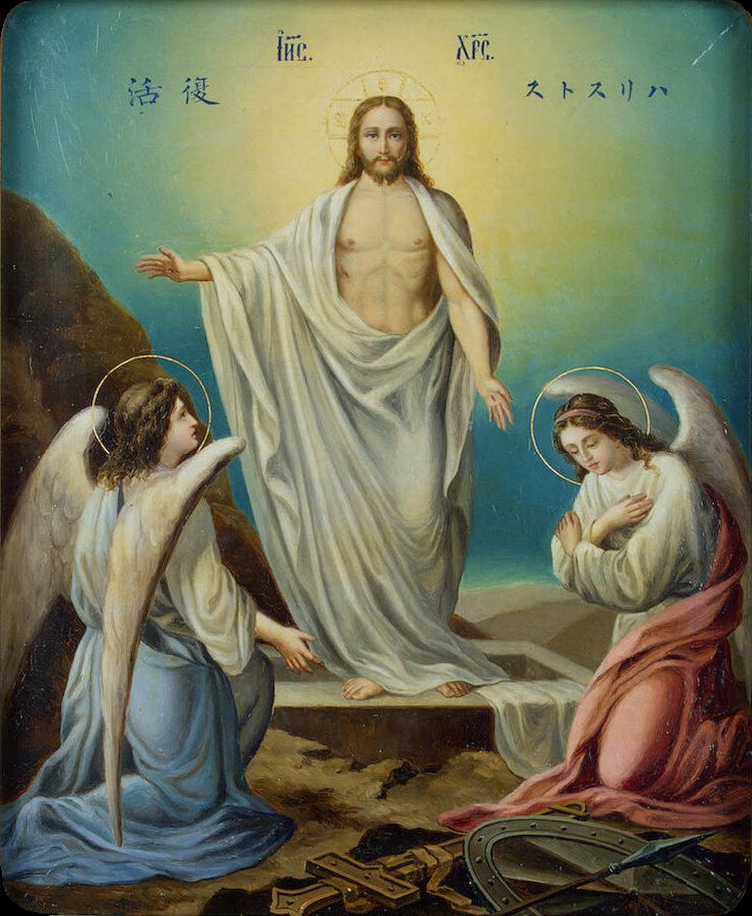
The Resurrection by Yamashita Rin in the Hermitage, commissioned by Nicholas of Japan for the 1891 visit of Tsarevich Nicholas Alexandrovich

Yamashita was born in 1857 to a samurai family in the Kasama Domain, in what is now Ibaraki Prefecture. Her family suffered hardship following her father's death in 1863. Aged 15 she ran away from home to avoid marriage to a farmer; after returning, she departed the following year to study painting in Tokyo. There she studied first with ukiyo-e artists Toyohara Chikanobu and Toyohara Kunichika, then with Tsukioka Ransetsu (月岡藍雪) of the Maruyama School, before turning to Nakamaru Seijūrō (中丸精十郎) for instruction in yōga. In 1877 she entered the Kōbu Bijutsu Gakkō (工部美術学校), her fees paid by the former daimyō of Kasama, whom her father had served. There she studied under Antonio Fontanesi. The following year she converted to Orthodox Christianity, taking the name Irina. Dissatisfied with Fontanesi's successor, Yamashita dropped out in 1880. That December, at the instigation of Ivan Dimitrovich Kasatkin, she left Yokohama by ship for Russia, to train as an icon painter. Arriving in Saint Petersburg in March, she entered the Novodevichy Convent, noting in her diary her sadness at her hosts' preference for Greek rather than Italianate painting; she described this as "Obake-e". In 1883 she returned to Japan via Berlin and Paris, arriving in Yokohama in April. Yamashita subsequently took up residence and formed a workshop in a seminary in Surugadai in Tokyo, on lands belonging to the Holy Resurrection Cathedral, then under construction. In 1889 she returned briefly to Kasama. In 1905 her older brother died, followed by her mother three years later. The Russian Revolution brought uncertainty to the Church and interrupted avenues of financial support. In 1918 Yamashita left Tokyo and returned home to Kasama, where she lived in retirement for the next thirty years off her savings and the forty yen she received from the Church each June and December. In 1937 her younger brother died. Yamashita died at the age of 81 on 26 January 1939.

== Painting ==
Few of Yamashita's works bear her signature, but detailed study has identified her icons in over forty churches across Japan. Paintings, drawings, and other materials relating to her life and art are on display at the Hakurinkyo (白凜居) in Kasama.

== See also ==
- Christianity in Japan
