= Northern Territories Day =

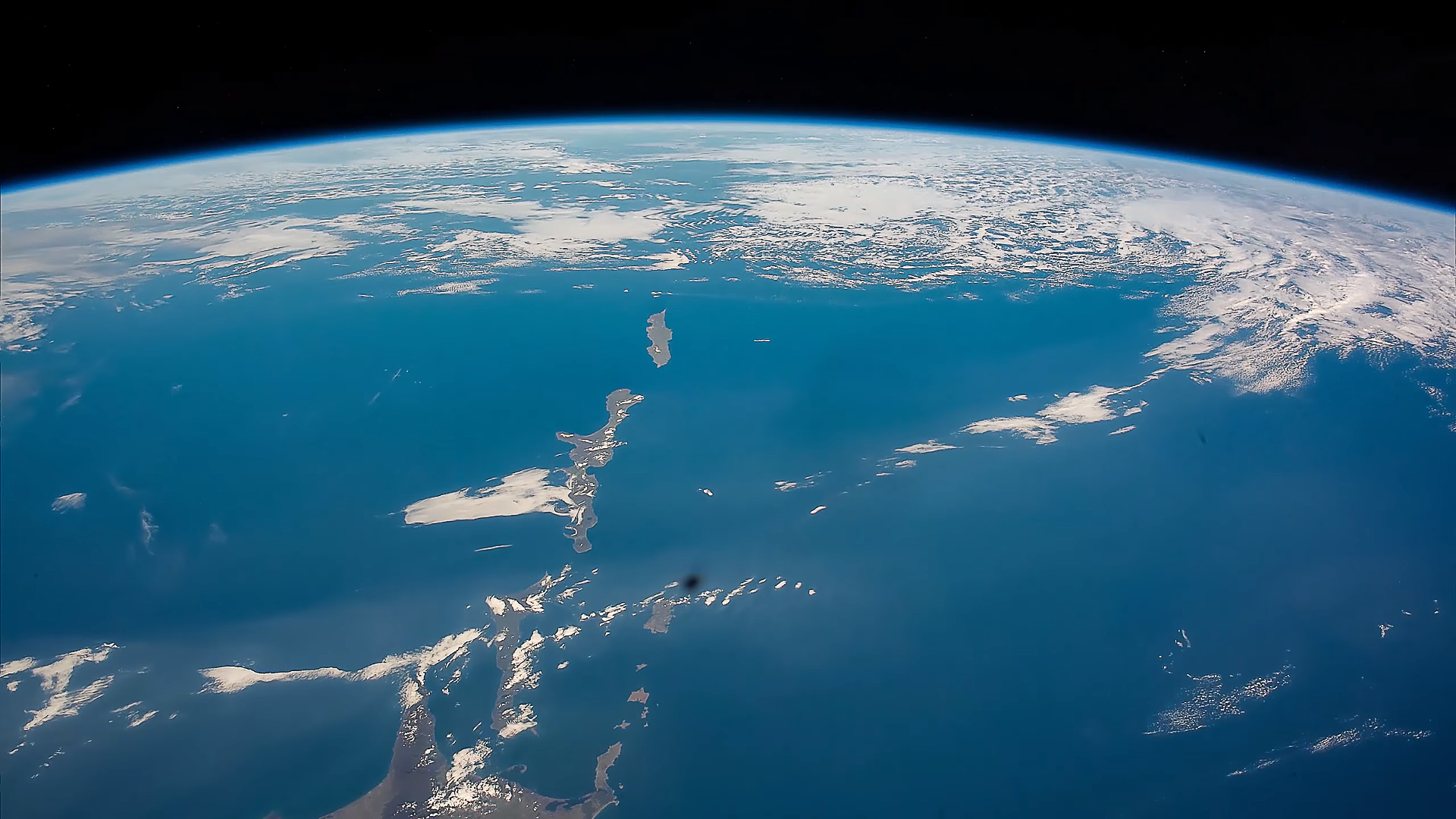
Southern Kuril islands

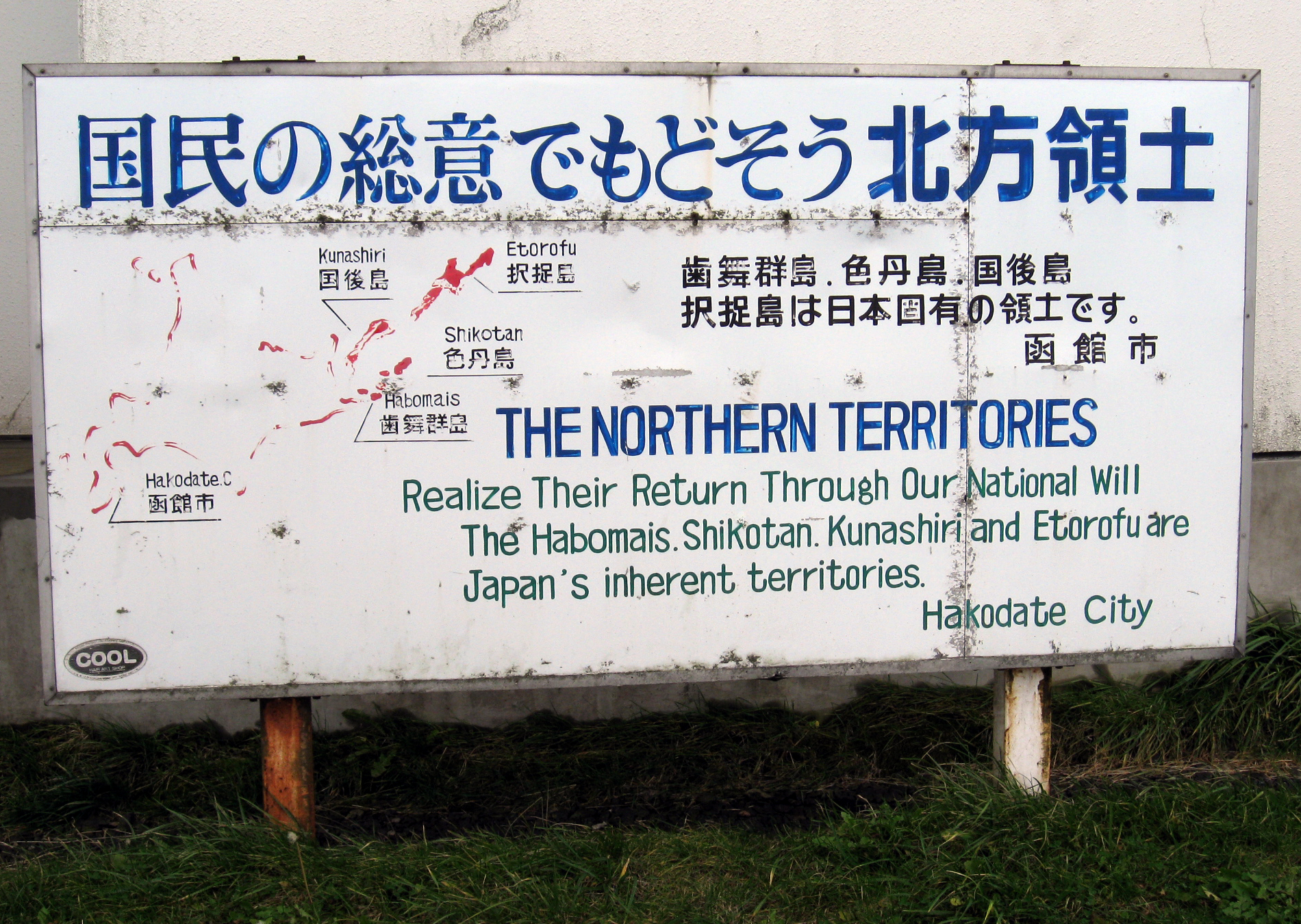
Signboard supporting the Japanese point of view

Northern Territories Day (Japanese: 北方領土の日) is an annual commemoration on February 7 by the Ministry of Foreign Affairs of Japan to spread awareness of its position on the Kuril Islands dispute. Northern Territories Day is not one of the public holidays in Japan, so government offices and businesses are open (National Foundation Day follows soon thereafter on February 11). Its date is set to February 7 each year because on February 7, 1855, Japan and Russia had signed the Treaty of Shimoda.

The San Francisco Peace Treaty, signed between the Allies and Japan in 1951, states that Japan must give up "all right, title and claim to the Kuril Islands", but it also does not recognize the Soviet Union's sovereignty over them. Japan claims that at least some of the disputed islands are not a part of the Kuril Islands, and thus are not covered by the treaty. The day is similar to Takeshima Day in Shimane Prefecture, which celebrates the Japanese point of view in the Liancourt Rocks dispute.

== See also ==
- Nemuro Strait
- Japan–Russia border
