= List of different terms by Christian denominations in Japanese =

List of different terms by Christian denominations in Japanese presents the difference of terms between Christian denominations in Japanese. This article presents Japanese terms of Eastern Orthodoxy (Japanese Orthodox Church), Roman Catholic, Anglican Church (Anglican Church in Japan), and Protestant.

In Japan, the Roman Catholic mission began in August 1549, Protestant mission - in 1859, Eastern Orthodox mission - 1861.

Each different mission founded their churches, determined terms in Japanese, and translated the Bible and other religious books, whose activities are almost separately by denominations.

Their terms have concepts found by each theology or history, etc. They are suitable for using in own denomination. Thus Japanese Christians use many different terms in each denomination.

== Liturgy ==
English	Eastern Christianity	Western Christianity		
English	Eastern Orthodoxy (Japanese Orthodox Church)	Roman Catholic in Japan	Anglican Church (Anglican Church in Japan)	Protestant in Japan
Sacrament	機密	秘蹟	聖奠	礼典
liturgy, rite, Christian worship, Church service	奉神礼	典礼	礼拝	礼拝
Divine Liturgy	聖体礼儀	-	-	-
Mass	-	ミサ	聖餐式	-
Having Communion (Eucharist)	領聖 or キノニア or 共與	聖体拝領 or コムニオ	陪餐 or コミュニオン	陪餐 or コミュニオン

== Clergy ==
As Protestantism does not have a hierarchy, its frames are omitted here.

In some of Protestants, bishop is "監督", pastor is "牧師" and deacon is "執事".

English	Eastern Christianity	Western Christianity	
English	Eastern Orthodoxy (Japanese Orthodox Church)	Roman Catholic in Japan	Anglican Church (Anglican Church in Japan)
Pope	パパ	教皇 or パパ	-
Patriarch	総主教	総大司教	-
exarch	総主教代理	-	-
cardinal	-	枢機卿	-
Metropolitan bishop	府主教	首都大司教	-
archbishop	大主教	大司教	大主教
suffragan bishop	-	属司教	補佐主教
coadjutor bishop	-	協働司教	-
auxiliary bishop	-	補佐司教	-
titular bishop	-	名義司教	-
bishop	主教	司教	主教
archimandrite	掌院	-	-
hegumen	典院	-	-
hieromonach	修道司祭	-	-
protopresbyter	首司祭	-	-
archpriest	長司祭	主席司祭	-
priest	司祭	司祭	司祭
archdeacon	首輔祭	助祭長	大執事
protodeacon	長輔祭	-	-
hierodeacon	修道輔祭	-	-
deacon	輔祭	助祭	執事
permanent deacon	-	終身助祭	-
subdeacon	副輔祭	副助祭	-
catechist	伝教者	カテキスタ	伝道師
reader	誦経者	読師	-
server, or acolyte	堂役	侍者	サーバー

== Saints ==
English	Eastern Orthodoxy (Japanese Orthodox Church)	Roman Catholic in Japan
Venerable	克肖者	尊者
Martyr	致命者	殉教者
Blessed	至福者	福者
Confessor	表信者	証聖者
Stylites	登塔者	柱頭行者
