= Sergius Tikhomirov =

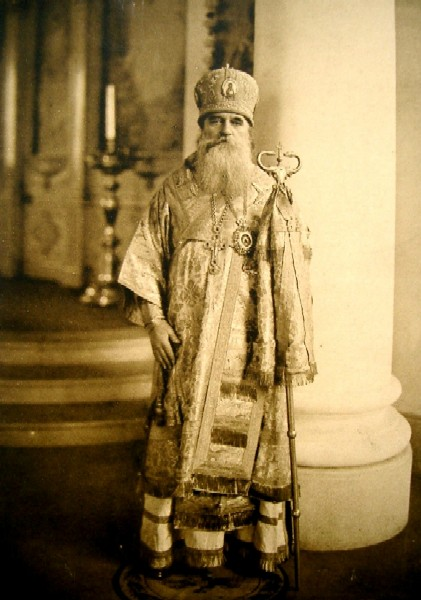
Metropolitan Sergius of Japan

Metropolitan Sergius (secular name Georgiy Alexeyevich Tikhomirov, Russian: Георгий Алексеевич Тихомиров; June 16, 1871 – August 10, 1945) was a bishop of the Orthodox Eastern Church. He first served in Russia, but spent most of his episcopate in Japan (1908 - 1945) in the Russian Orthodox Christian mission and in the Japanese Orthodox Church.

== Early life in Russia ==
He was born on June 16, 1871, as Alexiy in a village of Guzi near Novgorod, Russia, in the family of a rural priest Tikhomirov. He studied well, entered in the St. Petersburg Theological Academy and graduated in 1896. In 1895 Alexiy took the monastic vows with the name Sergius.

Later he taught theology at the St. Petersburg Theological Seminary, and in 1899 became the prefect of the St. Petersburg Theological Academy, in the rank of archimandrite.

In 1905 he was raised to episcopacy and was consecrated Bishop of Jamburg, vicar to the Archbishop of St. Petersburg, at the age of 35. Throughout his tenure at the Academy he was a prolific preacher as well as an author of a number of works on the Church history of his native Novgorod region.

== His life in Japan ==
In 1908, bishop Sergius was sent to Japan, to become a successor to archbishop Nicholas (Kasatkin). Having acquainted himself with Japan and quickly mastered the language, Sergius showed himself a committed spokesmen for the Orthodox Christian faithful of Japan's recent acquisitions in Southern Sakhalin (Japan had acquired Southern Sakhalin, or Karafuto in Japanese, as a result of the Russo-Japanese War of 1904-1905); and he secured the return of confiscated Church property to the faithful. In 1912, archbishop Nicolas reposed, and Sergius took over as ruling bishop of the Japanese Orthodox mission. Some five years later he had to face the difficulties caused to the mission by the Russian Revolution of 1917: having no aid from an established church in Russia meant the loss of almost the entire budget of the mission, which had to cut back its activities but survived.

In 1923, the Great Kantō earthquake destroyed the headquarters of the Japanese Orthodox Church, severely damaging the Tokyo Resurrection Cathedral. Raising funds for its restoration became a central activity of bishop Sergius and the Japanese faithful for the next years, and they succeeded in independently raising a vast sum and restoring the cathedral by 1929.

In 1931, the then archbishop Sergius was elevated to the rank of Metropolitan bishop by the Moscow Patriarchate. However, the 1930s saw the rise of militarism and nationalism amongst the Japanese, many of whom became prejudiced against Christianity and all things foreign. In 1940, Sergius was ousted from his position at the head of the Japanese Orthodox Church, so that the Church might comply with the Japanese government's demand for all ruling clergy in Japanese religious organizations to be native. Sergius spent the wartime years in obscurity, and in 1945 he was arrested by the Japanese special police on suspicion of being a Soviet Russian spy.

By the time of his release, his health was terminally undercut, and he died on August 10, 1945, five days before the end of World War II. His remains rest beside those of St. Nicolas of Japan, in the Yanaka Cemetery in Tokyo.
