= Undo (disambiguation) =

Undo is a command in many computer programs.

Undo or UNDO may also refer to:

== Music ==
- "Undo" (Rush of Fools song), a 2007 song by American contemporary Christian band Rush of Fools
- "Undo" (Sanna Nielsen song), a 2014 song by Swedish singer Sanna Nielsen
- "Undo", a song by Icelandic singer Björk on her fourth studio album Vespertine
- "UNDO", a song by Japanese rock band Cool Joke, the theme from Fullmetal Alchemist

== Others ==
- Undo magazine, a Mexican visual design magazine
- Ukrainian National Democratic Alliance, the largest Ukrainian political party in the Second Polish Republic
- Undo (company), a software debugging company
