= Kaori Kawamura =

Japanese singer (1971–2009)

- Kaori Kawamura promoting her final original album K in 2009.

Japanese name
- Kanji: 川村カオリ
Transcriptions
- Romanization: Kawamura Kaori

Russian name
- Russian: Каори Кавамура
- Romanization: Kaori Kavamura

Kaori Kawamura (川村 カオリ, Kawamura Kaori; 23 January 1971 – 28 July 2009) was a rock and pop singer in Japan, born in Moscow, Soviet Union.

== Family background ==
Her father, Suguru Kawamura (川村秀), was a Japanese academic living in the Soviet Union, while her mother, Elena Alexandrovna Skudnova (Елена Александровна Скуднова), was Russian. The family moved to Japan when she was 11 years old, where Kaori was subjected to repeated bullying. She attempted to commit suicide several times. On one occasion, when she was an elementary school pupil, she broke both arm bones by herself, with the intention of skipping school. She used this as a stepping stone to enter the music industry.

== Career ==
She released her first single, "Zoo", at the age of 17 in 1988. She then made her debut with the album "Zoo" in 1988. In 1990 she had a hit with "Kamisama ga Oritekuru Yoru", and the following year with an upbeat version of the often-covered "Tsubasa wo Kudasai." That year she made the first of several movie appearances in "Tokyo Kyujitsu." From the mid-1990s, she split her time between New York and Japan, and got involved in the club scene in the late 1990s. In 1999 she married SOBUT guitarist MOTOAKI (real name Motoaki Karikomi, 刈込元朗), by whom she had a daughter, Lucia Karikomi (刈込るちあ), in 2001, but they were soon separated.

== Illness and death ==
In 2004, she was diagnosed with breast cancer, and became a spokeswoman for cancer activism. She and Motoaki divorced in 2007. In October 2008, she wrote on her blog that the cancer had returned and spread to her bones and lungs. That year she took on a busy schedule, performing concerts, publishing a book and releasing "K," her first original album in 13 years. She died from the disease in Tokyo in 2009, aged 38.

An Orthodox Christian, her panikhída (memorial service) was held on July 30, and her funeral the next day at the Japanese Orthodox Church's Holy Resurrection Cathedral. Her Christian name was Anastasia.

== Discography ==
- Zoo (1988)
- Campfire (1989)
- Hippies (1990)
- Church (1991)
- Weed (1992)
- Beata (1995)
- Banbita (1996)
- Kaori Kawamura Best Collection (2008)
- K (2009)
- Message: Last Live 2009.05.05 (2010)
