= Takeshima Day =

Japanese holiday

In Japan, Takeshima Day (竹島の日) is celebrated on February 22 every year since 2005. Public events related to Takeshima are held on this day, and the day is also used to demonstrate Japan's sovereignty over the Liancourt Rocks.

== History ==
Both Japan and South Korea have sworn sovereignty over the Liancourt Rocks, which is currently occupied by South Korea. Since at least 1954, the Shimane prefectural government has been taking steps to strengthen its sovereignty over the Liancourt Rocks, and in 1996, the Shimane prefectural government submitted a report to the Japanese government requesting the establishment of an exclusive economic zone that includes the Liancourt Rocks.

In 2003, Jodai Yoshiro, an official of Shimane Prefecture, expressed his dissatisfaction to government's attitude at a meeting, saying that "Similarly to the Northern Territories Day, it is desirable to have a national Takeshima Day, as a tool in enhancing the national movement."

In March 2005, the Shimane Prefectural Government officially adopted an ordinance establishing the Takeshima Day, intended to "commemorate" the 100th anniversary of Japan gaining control of the islands. Local politicians have tried to elevate this festival to a national holiday. The Japanese government has rejected a proposal to make it a national holiday.

In 2013, the central government of Japan sent officials to Shimane Prefecture to celebrate this festival for the first time. Since then, the Japanese government has sent officials to this event for nine consecutive years.

== Reception ==
In October 2005, the Party for the Protection of Tokdo launched a petition to establish a "Dokdo Day", which was submitted to the National Assembly and accepted on December 10.

Citizen groups in Korea have organized several demonstrations in front of the Japanese Embassy against the holiday. Cho Tae-yong, a spokesperson of South Korea's foreign ministry, said in a statement that sending a senior official to the event would undoubtedly harm relations between the two countries.
