= Ethnic groups of Japan =

Among the several native ethnic groups of Japan, the predominant group are the Yamato Japanese, who trace their origins back to the Yayoi period and have held political dominance since the Asuka period. Other historical ethnic groups have included the Ainu, the Ryukyuan people, the Emishi, and the Hayato, some of whom were dispersed or absorbed by other groups. Ethnic groups that inhabited the Japanese islands during prehistory include the Jomon people and lesser-known Paleolithic groups.

In more recent history, a number of immigrants from other countries have made their home in Japan. In 2018, 97.8% of the population of Japan were Japanese citizens, with the remainder being foreign nationals residing in Japan. The number of foreign workers has been increasing dramatically in recent years, due to the aging population and the lack of labor force. A 2018 article stated that approximately 1 out of 10 young people residing in Tokyo were foreign nationals.

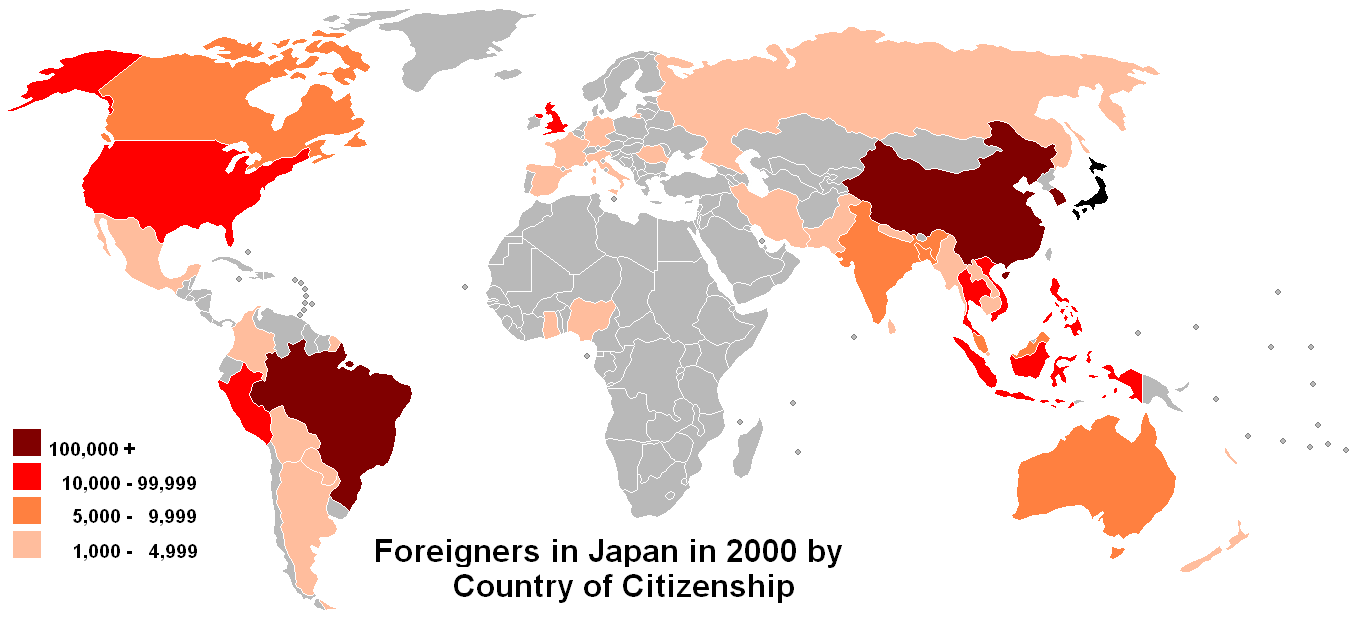
Citizenship of foreigners in Japan in 2000. Source: Japan Statistics Bureau

== Demographics ==
In 2020, about 2.3% of Japan's legal resident population were foreign citizens. The below statistics do not include indigenous minority groups who are Japanese citizens such as the Ainu and Ryukyuans, naturalized Japanese citizens from other countries, Japanese citizens descended from immigrants, or illegal immigrants. They do not include the 60,000+ American military members stationed in Japan, their 35,000+ dependents, and the 7,000+ Department of Defense employees working alongside them.

As of 2022, the principal groups are as follows:

Country region groups	Number	Percentage of	
Country region groups	Number	Foreign citizens	Total population
Southeast Asians	1,304,765	45.2%	1.0%
Non-Japanese East Asians	1,301,610	45.1%	1.0%
South Asians	255,168	8.8%	0.20%
Europeans and North Americans	84,916	2.9%	0.05%
Total (as of 2022)	2,887,116	100%	2.3%

Nationality	Number	Percentage of	
Nationality	Number	Foreign citizens	Total population
China	778,112	27.81%	0.64%
(South Korea) (North Korea) Korea (Note: Japan recognizes South Korea as the sole authority of the entire Korean Peninsula and does not consider passports issued by North Korea to be valid, instead using the term Chōsen-seki to refer to all ethnic Koreans in Japan who hold neither Japanese nor South Korean citizenship.)	454,122	16.23%	0.37%
Vietnam	448,053	16.01%	0.37%
Philippines	279,660	9.99%	0.23%
Brazil	208,538	7.45%	0.17%
Nepal	139,393	4.98%	0.11%
Indonesia	66,832	2.39%	0.05%
Taiwan	55,872	2.00%	0.05%
United States	55,761	1.99%	0.05%
Thailand	53,379	1.91%	0.04%
Peru	48,256	1.72%	0.04%
India	40,752	1.46%	0.03%
Myanmar	35,049	1.25%	0.03%
Sri Lanka	34,966	1.25%	0.03%
Bangladesh	20,954	0.75%	0.02%
Pakistan	19,103	0.68%	0.02%
United Kingdom	16,891	0.60%	0.01%
Cambodia	16,659	0.60%	0.01%
Mongolia	13,504	0.48%	0.01%
France	12,264	0.44%	0.01%
Total (as of 2022)	2,798,120	100%	2.3%

== Notion of ethnic homogeneity in Japan ==
After the demise of the multi-ethnic Empire of Japan in 1945, successive governments forged a single Japanese identity by advocating monoculturalism and denying the existence of more than one ethnic group in Japan. In 2019, the Japanese parliament passed an act to recognize the Ainu people to be indigenous. However, the notion of ethnic homogeneity was so ingrained in Japan, to which the former Prime Minister Taro Aso (1940–), in 2020, notably claimed in an election campaign speech that "No other country but this one has lasted for as long as 2,000 years with one language, one ethnic group and one dynasty".

Pioneering remarks about ethnic rights was first made by Prime Minister Fukuda Yasuo in May 2008, who stated at the parliament, "We acknowledge the Ainu to be an ethnic minority as it has maintained a unique cultural identity and having a unique language and religion."

== Historical and modern minorities ==
Historical minorities: (arrived in Japan before or during 1700)

- Ainu people
- Ryukyuan people
- Chinese people
- Zainichi Koreans
- Russians
- Thais
- Vietnamese people
- Mixed-blood people (Hāfu)

Modern minorities: (arrived in Japan after 1700)

- Bonin Islanders
- Brazilians in Japan
- Indians in Japan
- Indonesians in Japan
- Nepalis in Japan
- Britons in Japan
- Filipinos in Japan
- French people in Japan
- Peruvians in Japan
- Mongolians in Japan

Since Russian invasion of Ukraine (after 2022)

- ukrainian in Japan or slavics in Japan

== Native Japanese people ==
=== Ainu ===
The Ainu people, also Aynu, are an indigenous people native to Hokkaido and northeastern Honshu, and the nearby Russian Sakhalin and Kuril Islands (both formerly part of the Japanese Empire), and Kamchatka Peninsula. They possess a language distinct from modern Japanese. They traditionally practiced tattooing and followed religious beliefs that are considered animism.

=== Bonin Islanders ===
The Bonin Islanders (Ōbeikei) are an ethnic group native to the Bonin Islands, also called the Ogasawara Islands, part of Tokyo Prefecture. They are descendants of Japanese, Europeans, White Americans, Polynesians and Micronesians who settled Hahajima and Chichijima in the 18th century. They speak a dialect of English, called Bonin English, and have traditionally practiced Christianity. Legal status of Bonin Islanders passed back and forth between the United States and Japan over the years. During and after World War II, many Bonin Islanders were forced to leave their homes. Some emigrated to the United States, finding it easier to assimilate into an English-speaking Western culture than a Japanese-speaking Asian one. Today, roughly 200 Bonin Islanders remain in Japan, some bearing the surnames of the original 18th-century settlers.

=== Yamato ===
The Yamato people are the dominant native ethnic group of Japan. Because of their numbers, the term Yamato is often used interchangeably with the term Japanese.

=== Ryukyuans ===
The Ryukyuan people (also Lewchewan) are an indigenous people native to the Ryukyu Islands. There are different subgroups of the Ryukyuan ethnic group, the Okinawan, Amami, Miyako, Yaeyama and Yonaguni peoples. Their languages comprise the Ryukyuan languages, one of the two branches of the Japonic language family, the other being Japanese and its dialects. The Ryukyuans have a distinct culture with some matriarchal elements, native religion, and cuisine, which had fairly late 12th century introduction of rice.

== East Asian ==
=== Chinese ===
Chinese people in Japan are the largest foreign minorities in Japan. They comprise 0.64% of Japan's population. Chinese people are mostly concentrated in the Osaka, Tokyo and Yokohama areas.

=== Koreans ===
Koreans in Japan are the fifth largest ethnic minority in Japan. Most of them arrived in the early 20th century.

In 2024, there were 411,043 Koreans in Japan who were not Japanese citizens.

=== Nivkh ===
A small number of Nivkh people resettled in Hokkaido when Japan evacuated southern Sakhalin at the end of World War II.

== South Asian ==
South Asians in Japan live mostly in Tokyo.

=== Indians ===
In June 2022, there were 40,752 Indian nationals living in Japan. Indians in Japan are primarily employed in the information technology industry and other office jobs, where English language is used.

== Southeast Asian ==
=== Filipinos ===
In 2007, there were 202,592 Filipinos in Japan, making them Japan's third-largest foreign community along with Brazilians. In 2006, Japanese/Filipino marriages were the most frequent of all international marriages in Japan. In March 2011, the Filipino population of Japan was 305,972. In April 2020, the number of Filipinos in Japan was estimated at 325,000.

=== Vietnamese ===
In June 2024, 600,348 Vietnamese people were living in Japan.

== South American ==
=== Brazilians ===
There is a significant community of Brazilians in Japan, which is home to the fifth largest Brazilian community outside of Brazil. They constitute the largest number of Portuguese speakers in Asia, even greater than those of formerly Portuguese East Timor, Macao and Goa combined. Brazil maintains its status as home to the largest Japanese community outside of Japan.

=== Peruvians ===
In December 2024, there were 49,247 Peruvian residents in Japan. The majority of them are descendants of earlier Japanese immigrants to Peru who have repatriated to Japan. Former Peruvian President Alberto Fujimori is one example of a Peruvian Japanese.

== Oceanian ==
=== Australians ===
In December 2023, there were 13,015 resident Australians in Japan.

=== New Zealanders ===
In December 2024, there were 4,022 resident New Zealanders in Japan.

== See also ==
- Ethnic nationalism in Japan
