= Holy Resurrection Orthodox Church of Hakodate =

Building in Hakodate, Hokkaido Prefecture, Japan

Coordinates: 41°45′46″N 140°42′44″E

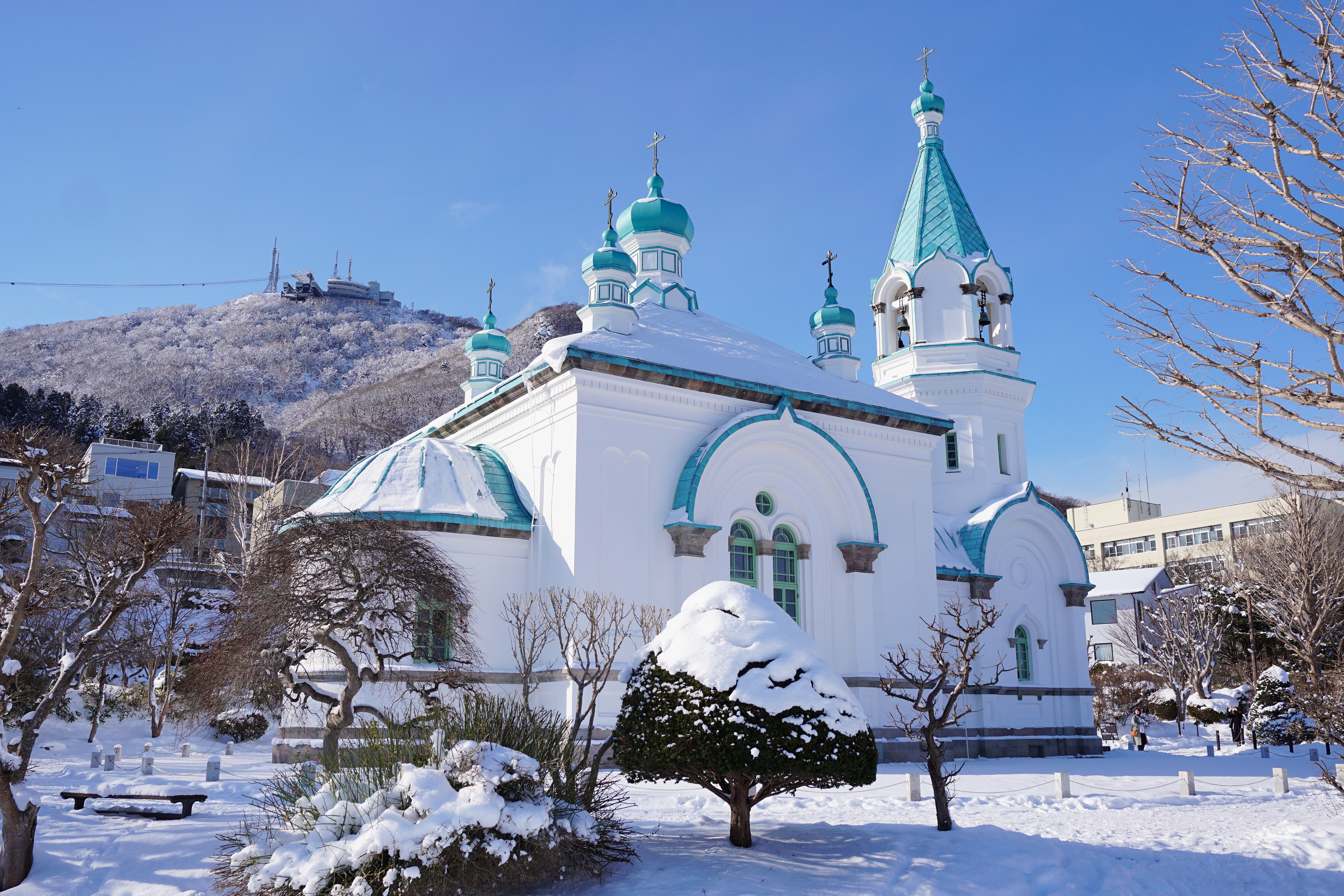
Hakodate Orthodox Church

Holy Resurrection Orthodox Church of Hakodate (函館ハリストス正教会, Hakodate Harisutosu Seikyōkai) is a Japanese Orthodox Church in the city of Hakodate, Hokkaido, Japan.

The first purpose-built Orthodox Christian church to open in Japan was the wooden Russian Consulate chapel of the Resurrection of Christ, in Hakodate, Hokkaido, consecrated in October 1860.
