= Japan–Russia border =

International border

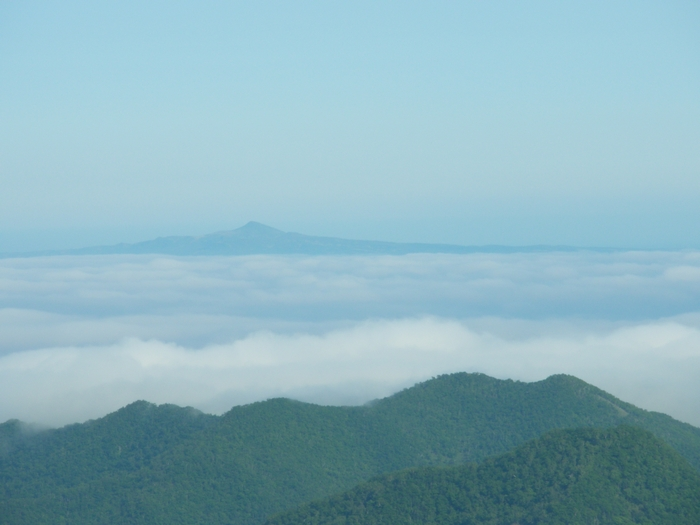
- Russian's Kunashir Island (background) seen from Japan's Shiretoko Peninsula (foreground)

Characteristics
- Entities: Japan; Russia
- Length: 194.3 km

History
- Established: 1855
- Current shape: 1945; Potsdam Declaration, Treaty of San Francisco
- Treaties: Treaty of Shimoda, Treaty of Saint Petersburg (1875), Treaty of Portsmouth, Soviet–Japanese Joint Declaration of 1956
- Notes: Japanese invasion of Sakhalin, Russo-Japanese War, Soviet–Japanese War

The Japan–Russia border is the de facto maritime boundary that separates the territorial waters of the two countries. According to the Russian border agency, the border's length is 194.3 km (120.7 mi).

The two countries do not share a terrestrial border, although they did during the period 1905–1945 when the island of Sakhalin was split between Japan and the Russian Empire (and later the USSR).

== History ==
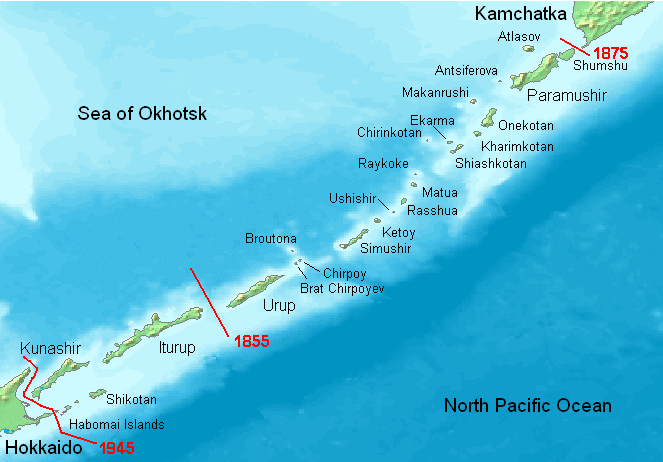
The shifting border in the Kuril Islands

The border between Russia and Japan has changed several times over the last 200 years. The Treaty of Shimoda (1855) divided the Kuril Islands, creating a maritime boundary between the Japanese Etorofu (Iturup) in the south and the Russian Urup in the north. The treaty did not determine the status of Sakhalin.

The Treaty of Saint Petersburg (1875) assigned Sakhalin Island to Russia and all of the Kurile Islands to Japan. Thus during the following 30 years the maritime border between the two empires ran along the La Pérouse Strait (between Hokkaido and Sakhalin) and the Kuril Strait (between Russian Kamchatka and Shumshu Island in the Kurils).

During the Russo-Japanese War, Japan was able to invade and occupy the whole of Sakhalin island over several weeks in July 1905. By the Treaty of Portsmouth, which concluded the war, Russia ceded the southern half of Sakhalin to Japan (incorporated as Karafuto Prefecture), while Japanese troops withdrew from its northern half; thus the two countries the first time in their history shared a land border, which ran along the 50th parallel north across the entire island of Sakhalin, from the Strait of Tartary to the Sea of Okhotsk. Even though Japan occupied the northern part of Sakhalin in 1920–1925, during and after the Russian Civil War, Soviet control in the northern Sakhalin was established in 1925, and the 50th parallel became the Japan-USSR border.

Since the Japanese Empire incorporated Korea by 1910, the short Korea–Russia border also became part of the border between the Japanese and Russian Empires, and later (until 1945), between the Japanese Empire and the USSR.

The land border in Sakhalin was crossed by the Soviet Army in August 1945, while Soviet marines landed in the Kurils. As a result of the short Soviet–Japanese War, the whole of Sakhalin and the Kurils became de facto (and de jure, under the Soviet law) part of the USSR, and of its core part, the RSFSR. Even though the USSR and Japan reestablished diplomatic relations a decade later (the Soviet–Japanese Joint Declaration of 1956), no peace treaty or maritime boundary agreement between the two countries has been signed.

== Description ==
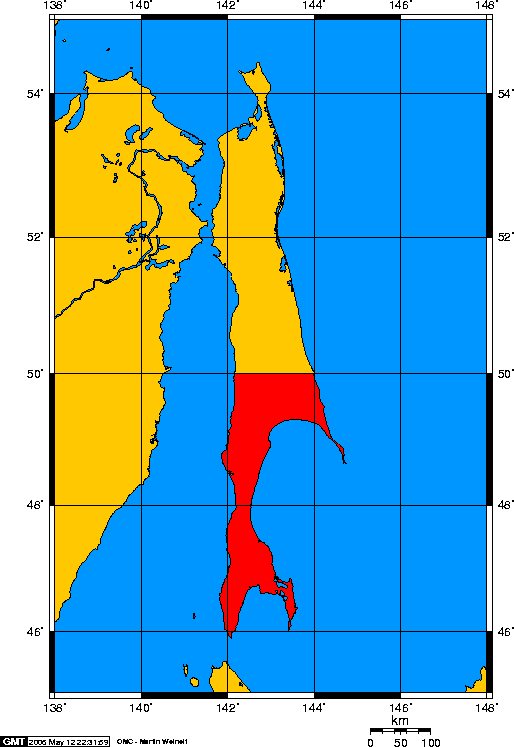
The former land border on Sakhalin (Russia in yellow, Japan in red)

The existing de facto (and, from the Russian point of view, also de jure) Russian-Japanese border follows several sea straits: the La Pérouse Strait, the Nemuro Strait, and Izmeny Strait (Notsuke Strait) and the Sovietsky Strait, which separate Sakhalin and the Kuril Islands from the Japanese island of Hokkaido. In Japan's view, the de jure border passes through the La Perouse Strait and the Vries Strait.

== Territorial disputes ==
Japan claims the southern group of the Kuril Islands (viz. Iturup, Shikotan, Kunashir and Habomai), which were occupied by the Soviet Union in 1945 and incorporated into its Sakhalin Oblast. Russia treats the islands as an integral part of the country.

== Sakhalin-Hokkaido tunnel ==
The map of the tunnel/bridge when it's complete, according to the proposal.

The Sakhalin-Hokkaido tunnel, or possibly a bridge, is a proposed 45 km (28 miles) connection to Russia's Sakhalin island and Japan's Hokkaido island. When the project is complete, it will span the Soya strait; if a bridge is constructed it will be the longest bridge in the world, enabling people to travel between island by either railway or a road.

== Checkpoints ==
There are no border crossing points on the Russian-Japanese border, as it is a purely maritime boundary.

During the existence of the land border in Sakhalin (1905–1945), it was crossed by one road.

However, when the Sakhalin-Hokkaido tunnel is complete, there will be checkpoints at the tunnel.

== See also ==
- Sakhalin-Hokkaido Tunnel
- Soviet–Japanese border conflicts
