= Cool Joke =

Japanese rock band

- Origin: Japan
- Genres: Rock, pop rock
- Years active: 2001–present
- Labels: high numbers dream
- Members: Hiroya Ishikawa; Suguru Asabatake; Hiroyuki Saitō
- Past members: Keita Hayashi
- Website: www.cooljoke.net

Cool Joke is a Japanese rock band formed in 2001. The band's current lineup consists of vocalist Hiroya Ishikawa (石川 寛也), guitarist Suguru Asabatake (麻畠 卓) and drummer Hiroyuki Saitō (斉藤 広幸).

In addition to Ishikawa, Asabatake and Saitō, the band originally featured bassist Keita Hayashi (林 圭太). However, Hayashi left the band in 2006. They performed under the Sony Music Japan Records label, but then moved to the high numbers dream indie label. During their time as an indie band, their activity was centered in the Fukui prefecture area. They are now performing on a nationally. One of their songs, "UNDO", was used as the third opening theme song for the popular anime television show, Fullmetal Alchemist.

== Discography ==
=== Albums ===
- [2005.10.26] COOL JOKE
- [2006.03.31] No.1
- [2008.11.12] Reality
- [2010.07.28] KING OF JOKE
- [2012.07.25] Riyuu ga née (Hiroya Ishikawa Solo Album)

=== Singles ===
- [2003.06.01] COOL JOKE
- [2003.08.01] Akatsuki no Rock n'Roll
- [2004.05.12] UNDO
- [2004.08.18] Ai no chikara
- [2005.01.19] OK, full throttle
- [2005.09.21] Sekai Wa Kimi No Te No Naka Ni, Hikari Wa Uta No Naka Ni
- [2007.07.06] Kachou fuugetsu (Digital single)
- [2010.04.07] KING OF JOKE (Digital single)
- [2010.05.06] Puka Puka (Digital single)
- [2012.02.29] UNDO -8years later-
