= Nicholas of Japan =

Russian Orthodox priest

Saint Nicholas (Kasatkin) of Japan
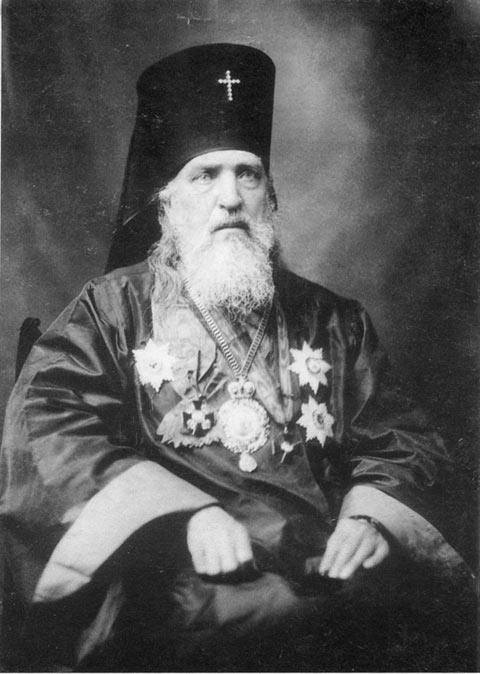

Equal-to-the-Apostles, Archbishop of Japan
- Born: Ivan Dmitrovich Kasatkin; 13 August [O.S. 1 August] 1836; Smolensk, Russian Empire
- Died: 16 February 1912 (aged 75); Tokyo City, Empire of Japan
- Venerated in: Eastern Orthodoxy
- Canonized: 1970, Tokyo, Japan
- Major shrine: Tokyo Resurrection Cathedral
- Feast: 3 February

Ordination history
History
Diaconal ordination
- Ordained by: Nektary Nadezhdin
- Date: 29 June 1860
- Place: Saint Petersburg
Priestly ordination
- Ordained by: Nektary Nadezhdin
- Date: 30 June 1860
- Place: Saint Petersburg

Nicholas of Japan (Russian: Николай Японский), Equal-to-the-Apostles, Archbishop of Japan, born Ivan Dmitrovich Kasatkin (Russian: Иван Дмитриевич Касаткин; 13 August [O.S. 1 August] 1836 – 16 February 1912) was a Russian Orthodox priest, monk, and bishop. He introduced the Eastern Orthodox Church to Japan.

The Orthodox cathedral of Tokyo (metropolitan diocese of Japan), Tokyo Resurrection Cathedral, was informally named after him as Nikorai-do, first by the local community, and today nationwide, in remembrance of his work. Nicholas has been called "arguably the most outstanding Russian Orthodox overseas missionary and one of the most successful Christian missionaries of all time". He was canonized in 1970 by the Orthodox Church.

Due to his contributions to scholarship, he is "rightfully considered the founder of scholarly Japanese studies in Russia".

== Early life ==
On 13 August [O.S. 1 August] 1836, Nicholas was born in the Smolensk prefecture in the Russian Empire to Dimitry Kasatkin, a Russian Orthodox deacon. His mother died when he was five years old.

In 1853, he entered the Smolensk Seminary, and graduated in 1857. That same year, he began to attend the Saint Petersburg Theological Academy for further studies, after being offered a scholarship there.

On 24 June 1860, he was tonsured a monk with the name Nicholas by the academy rector, Bishop Nektary Nadezhdin. Nicholas was ordained deacon on 29 June the same year. On the following day, on the altar day of the academy church (the feast day of the Holy Apostles, according to the Julian Calendar), he was ordained to the priesthood.

== Japan ==
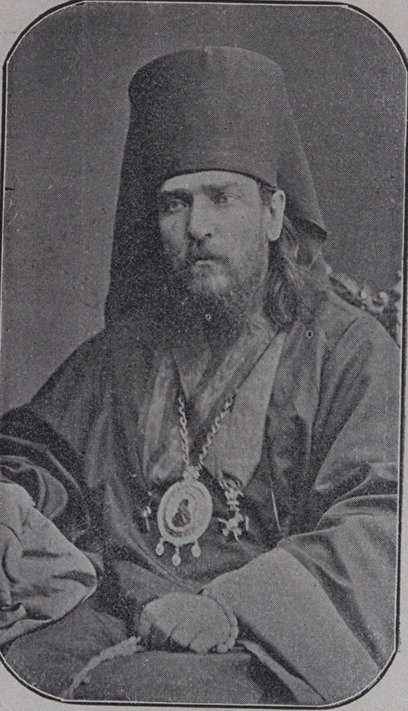
Nicholas of Japan, c. 1895

On 2 July 1861, Nicholas landed at Hakodate, Hokkaidō, Japan, as a priest attached to the chapel of the Russian consulate in Hakodate. He had volunteered for the appointment to this duty, attracted since the day he noticed a poster calling for a priest for this chapel when he was a seminary student. After he arrived at the consulate, he studied Japanese and quickly gained mastery of the language. He studied Buddhism during the first eight years of his time in Japan, when, in his words, he "strove with all diligence to study Japanese history, religion, and the spirit of the Japanese people".

While at the consulate chapel, Nicholas converted a former samurai and Shinto priest named Sawabe Takuma, who had originally come to Nicholas with the intention to kill him with a sword. At conversion, Sawabe was given the baptismal name Paul. He helped Nicholas convert two of his friends in April 1868, and later became one of the first Japanese Orthodox priests. In 1869, Nicholas returned to Russia, where the Church allowed him to set up a more formal mission.

In 1870, Nicholas was made an archimandrite and moved to Tokyo, and began an extensive missionary effort. He bought property on a height in Kanda Surugadai for his headquarters which later became the site of the see of the Orthodox Archbishop of Japan. Under his leadership, by 1870 the Orthodox community numbered more than 4,000 people, and by 1912 about 33,000 people and 266 Orthodox communities.

Nicholas was consecrated bishop on 30 March 1880, as Bishop of Reval (Tallinn), auxiliary to the Archdiocese of Riga. While Nicholas never visited the city, the parish of Reval supported his Japanese mission financially. In the Eastern Orthodox Church tradition, bishops sign with their see, but Nicholas made his habit to sign as "Episcop (Bishop) Nicholai", without mentioning Reval. He presided over the consecration of the Tokyo Resurrection Cathedral in 1891, and was elevated to the dignity of Archbishop of All Japan by the Russian Orthodox Holy Synod on 6 April, 1907.

=== Russo-Japanese War ===
During the Russo-Japanese War, Nicholas stayed in Japan. Those days were very difficult for him. His love for the land of his birth conflicted with his duty as the bishop of Japan to support his faithful and to pray for the Japanese emperor and the Imperial Japanese Army and Navy. In the Orthodox liturgy at that time, priests had to explicitly pray not only benediction on the sovereign and his army but also for the defeat of his enemies in the intercession. Nicholas, therefore, did not participate in any public services during the war; instead, he encouraged his Japanese faithful both to pray for and to contribute to the Army and the Navy. Some encouraged him to go back to Russia, but he refused and worked eagerly for Japanese faithful and Russian prisoners of war. In a letter on the conditions of a camp in Hamadera, Osaka, Nicholas wrote of his astonishment at the Russians soldiers' illiteracy: nine of ten captives could not read.

Nicholas sent priests and teachers to camps to educate and care for the captives. His attitude and manners impressed not only the Orthodox faithful but also non-Christians.

=== Death ===
Nicholas died on February 16, 1912.

== Character ==
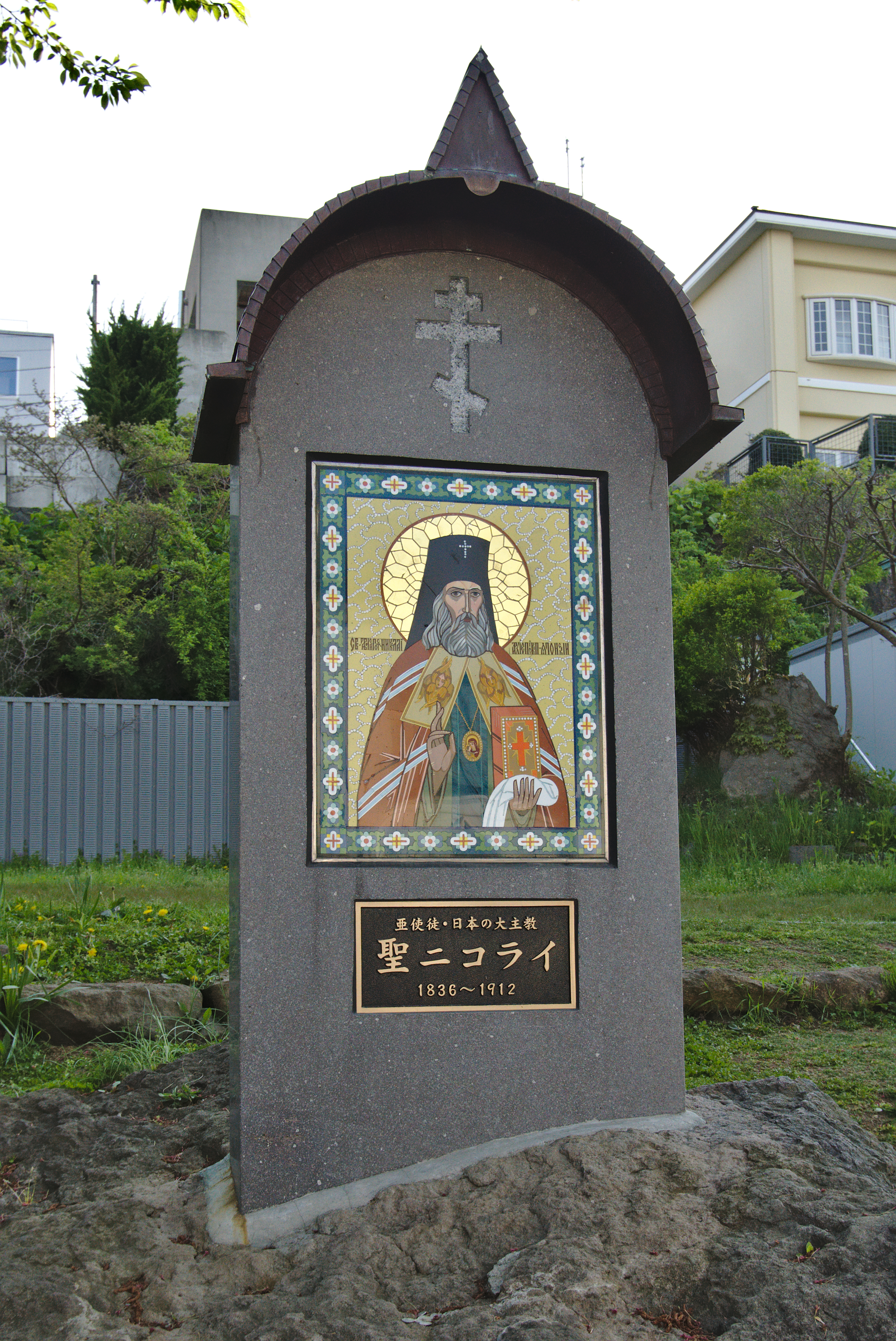
Icon of Nicholas of Japan at Hakodate Orthodox Church in May 2016

Even Emperor Meiji was impressed with his character, especially his diplomatic efforts between the Russian Imperial Household and the Japanese government. When the Russian Tsar Nicholas II was the Tsarevich under Alexander III, the young Nicholas II visited Japan and was injured during the Ōtsu Incident by a Japanese policeman. Bishop Nicholas made a great effort to resolve this incident.

Nicholas's study of Japanese was fruitful, allowing him to translate all liturgy books and many parts of the Bible including the whole of the New Testament and Psalms, most of the Book of Genesis and the Book of Isaiah with help from a Japanese Christian and scholar Nakai Tsugumaro who ran a kanbun private school Kaitokudo in Osaka. His translations are still used in the liturgy of Japanese Orthodox Church. Being fond of church singing, Kasatkin made a significant contribution in introducing this art to the Japanese. He also established a theological seminary, primary schools for boys and girls, a library, shelter and other agencies.

Nicholas wrote a diary in Russian for years, recording the pastoral life of early Orthodox Church of Japan as well as his thought and observation of Meiji era Japan. His diary was believed to have been burned and lost in Great Kantō earthquake of 1923, but rediscovered by Kennosuke Nakamura, a Russian literary researcher, and published in 2004 as Dnevniki Sviatogo Nikolaia Iaponskogo (5 vols. Saint Petersburg: Giperion, 2004). Nakamura translated the whole diary into Japanese and published with his commentary in 2007.

Nicholas offered an integral study of Buddhism in his work, "Japan from the point of view of Christian mission", published in 1869. This was the first description of Japanese Buddhism accessible to the Russian language reader.

== Veneration ==
Nicholas was the first saint of the Japanese Orthodox Church. After his death, his body was buried in Tokyo Metropolitan Yanaka Cemetery, near Ueno. On April 10 1970, he was canonized as 'Equal-to-the-Apostles, Archbishop of Japan, St Nicholas'. His feast day is 3 February (New Calendar), 16 February (Old Calendar). The Russian Orthodox Church and the Japanese Orthodox Church celebrate this feast nationwide on the old-style date.

There is a church which commemorates him in Maebashi, Gunma, built in 1974. There is also an Eastern Orthodox Church dedicated to Saint Nicholas of Japan in Moscow.

== See also ==
- Russians in Japan
