= Holy Resurrection Cathedral =

Coordinates: 35°41′52.93″N 139°45′55.92″E

- Tokyo Holy Resurrection Cathedral
- Nickolai Cathedral
- 東京復活大聖堂
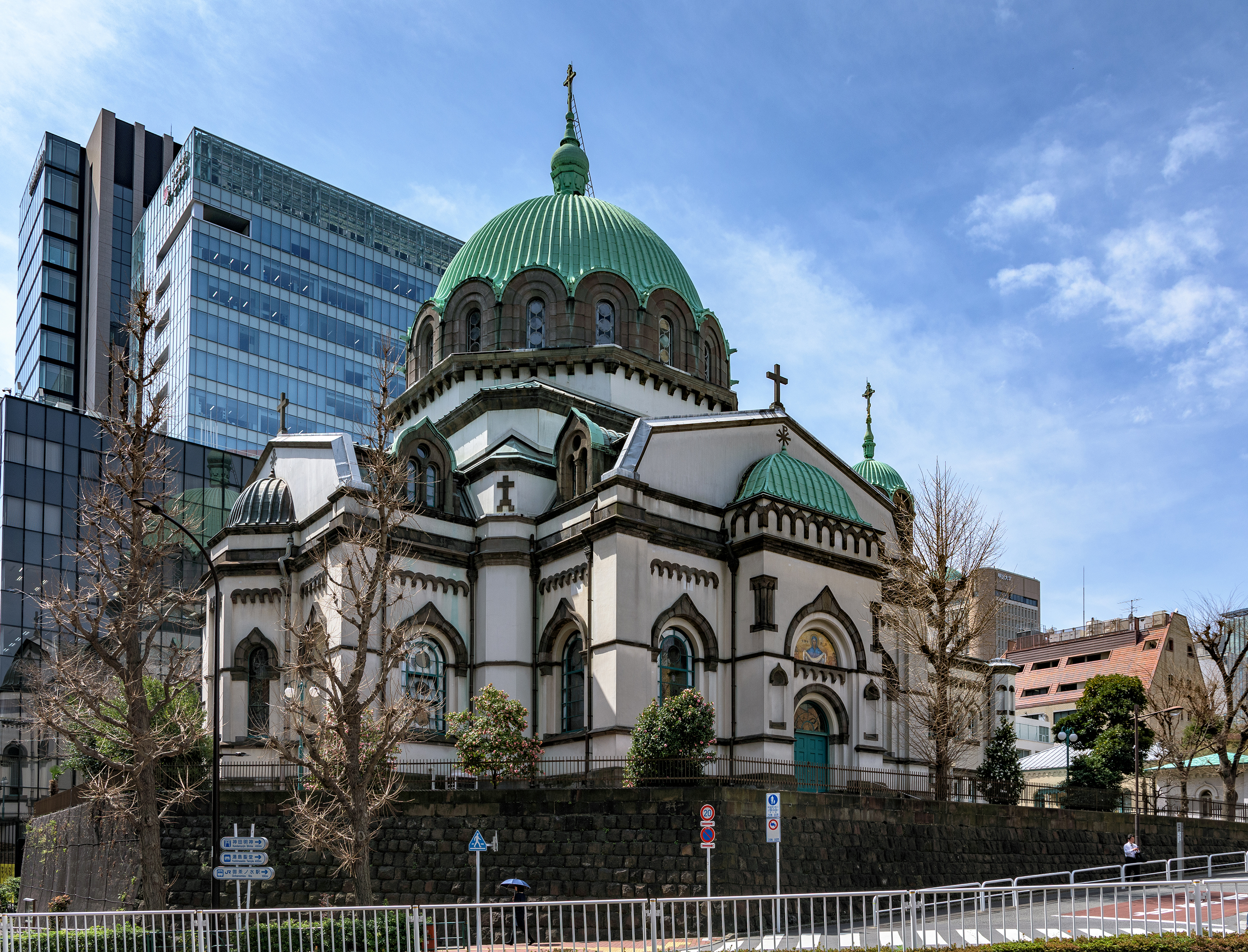
- Tokyo Resurrection Cathedral also known as Nikorai-do
- Holy Resurrection Cathedral
- Location: Chiyoda ward Tokyo
- Country: Japan
- Denomination: Eastern Orthodox
- Website: nikolaido.org

History
- Status: Cathedral
- Founded: 8 March 1891
- Founder: St. Nicholas of Japan
- Dedication: Resurrection of Jesus
- Consecrated: 15 December 1929

Architecture
- Functional status: Active
- Architects: Josiah Conder (1891); Shinito Okada (1929)
- Architectural type: Cathedral
- Style: Byzantine Revival architecture
- Completed: 1891; 1929 (current building)

Administration
- Province: Russian Orthodox Church
- Archdiocese: Japanese Orthodox Archdiocese of Tokyo

Clergy
- Archbishop: Metropolitan Seraphim (Tsujie) of All Japan and Archbishop of Tokyo.

The Holy Resurrection Cathedral (復活大聖堂, fukkatsu daiseidō; Russian: Токийский собор Воскресения), also known as Nikorai-do (ニコライ堂, nikorai-dō), is the main cathedral of the Japanese Orthodox Church, located in Chiyoda, Tokyo, Japan.

== History ==
Archbishop Nicholas (Kasatkin) (1836–1912), later canonized as St. Nicholas of Japan, was the founder of the Japanese Orthodox Church who devoted himself to improving Japanese-Russian relations during the Meiji period. He selected the location on the hill at Kanda Surugadai. The site is on a height that overlooked the Imperial Palace. Today it is hidden among the many tall buildings erected since the 1960s.

St. Nicholas toured Russia raising funds for the cathedral. The edifice was planned by Dr. Michael A. Shchurupov, designed by Josiah Conder, and constructed by Nagasato Taisuke. The cathedral was completed on March 8, 1891, construction having begun seven years earlier. Depictions of its exotic Byzantine architecture and the unique sound of its bell often appeared in literature and illustrations of the day.

The original cathedral was seriously damaged in the Great Kantō earthquake of September 1923. The main bell tower fell on the dome, collapsing it, thus causing major damage to the cathedral. Rebuilding the cathedral became a major task for the then-ruling bishop, Archbishop Sergius (Tikhomirov), who succeeded St. Nicholas after he died in 1912. Since Russia was no longer a source of funding, Archbishop Sergius had to look for funding within Japan. A significant amount of funding was raised by numerous concerts by the cathedral choir, led by Victor A. Pokrovsky. The re-built cathedral was re-consecrated on 15 December 1929, with a shorter bell tower, a modified dome, and a less ornate interior, according to design by Okada Shinichiro.

Despite the damage caused during the 1923 earthquake, the restoration preserved important original aspects of the building, as well as the adding new aspects of cultural importance. The Agency of Cultural Affairs conducted a survey of the building, and on June 21, 1962, Nikolai-do became a Nationally Designated Important Cultural Property (国定重要文化財, Kokutei jūyō bunkazai).

== Gallery ==
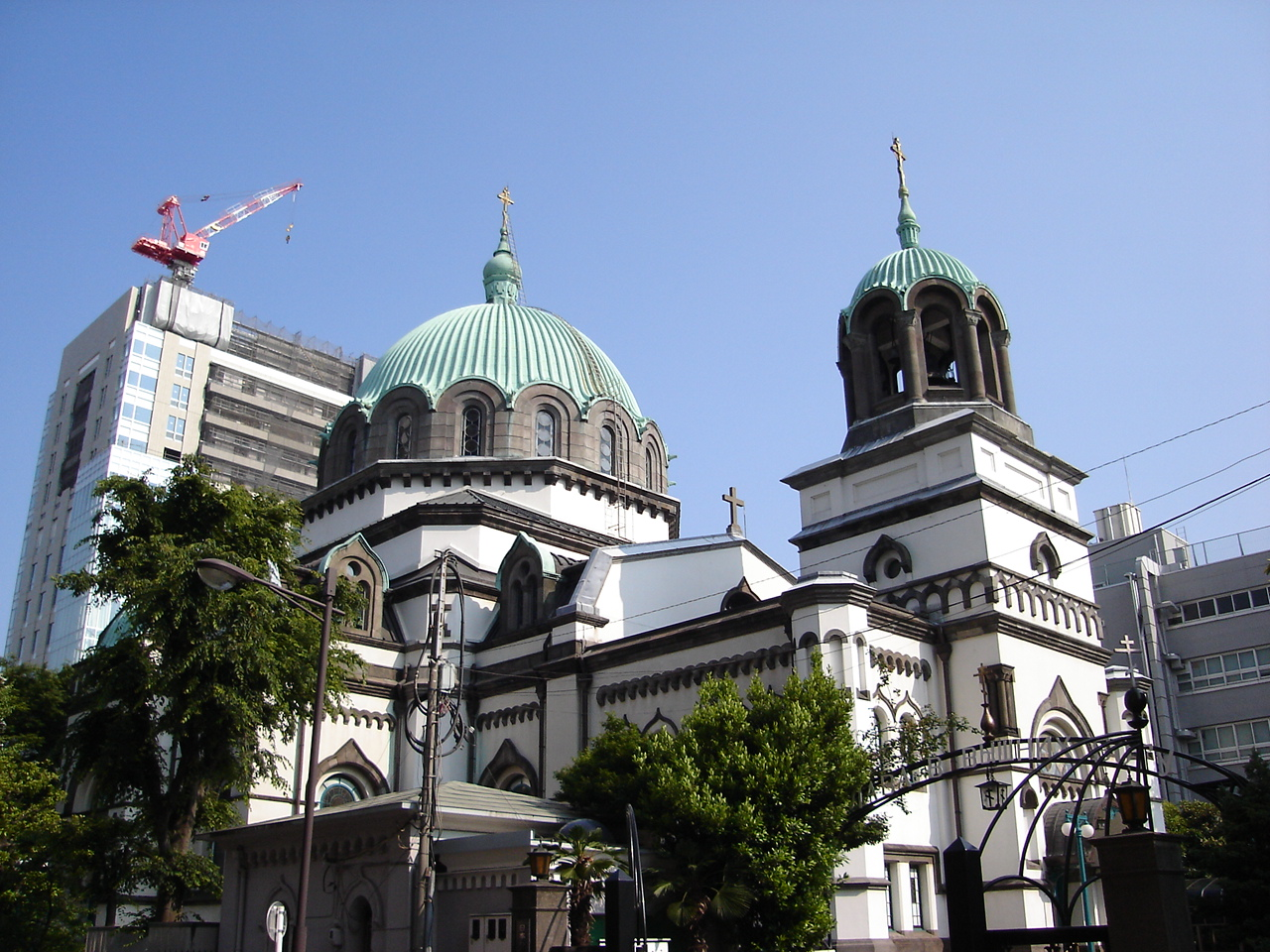
Tokyo Resurrection Cathedral, also known as Nikorai-do

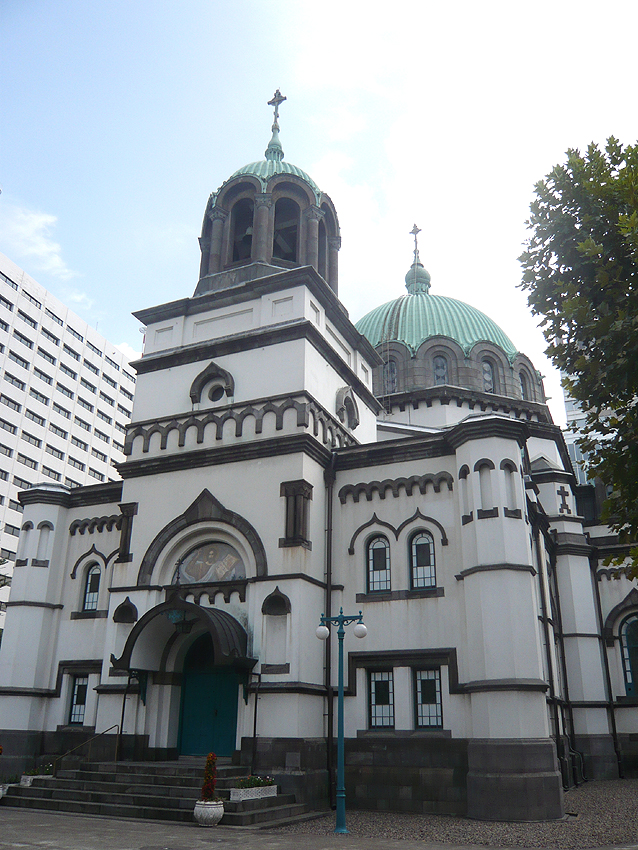
Entrance to Nikorai-do (2007)

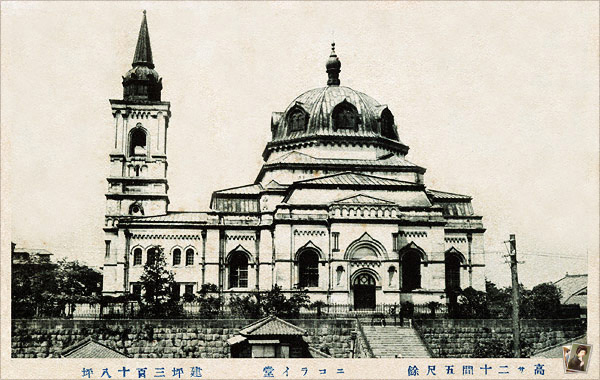
The cathedral in 1891

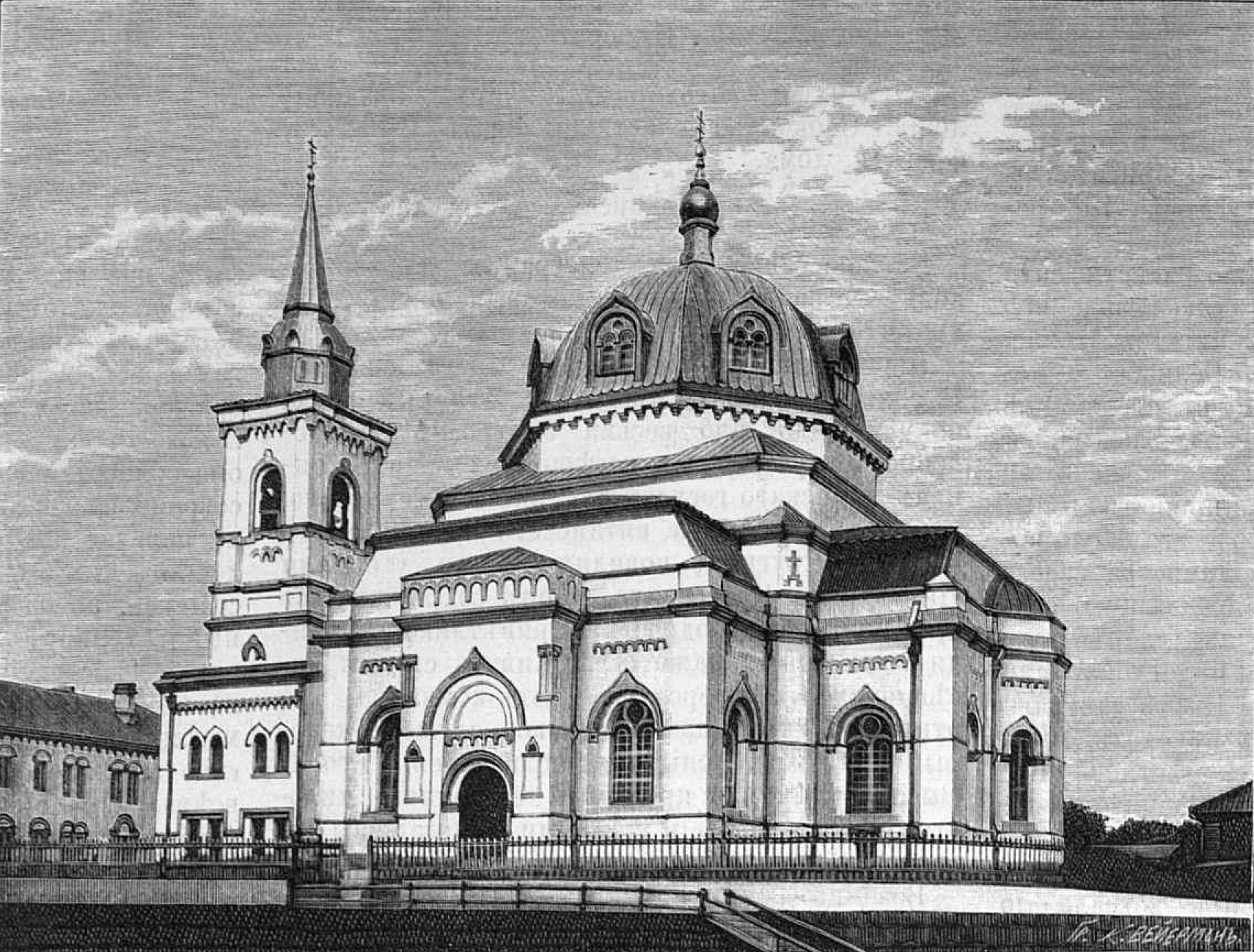
An artist's impression of the cathedral in 1891

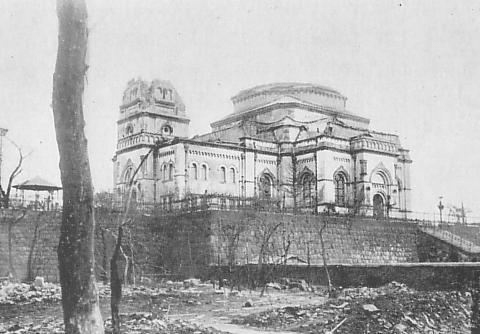
The cathedral after the 1923 Great Kanto earthquake

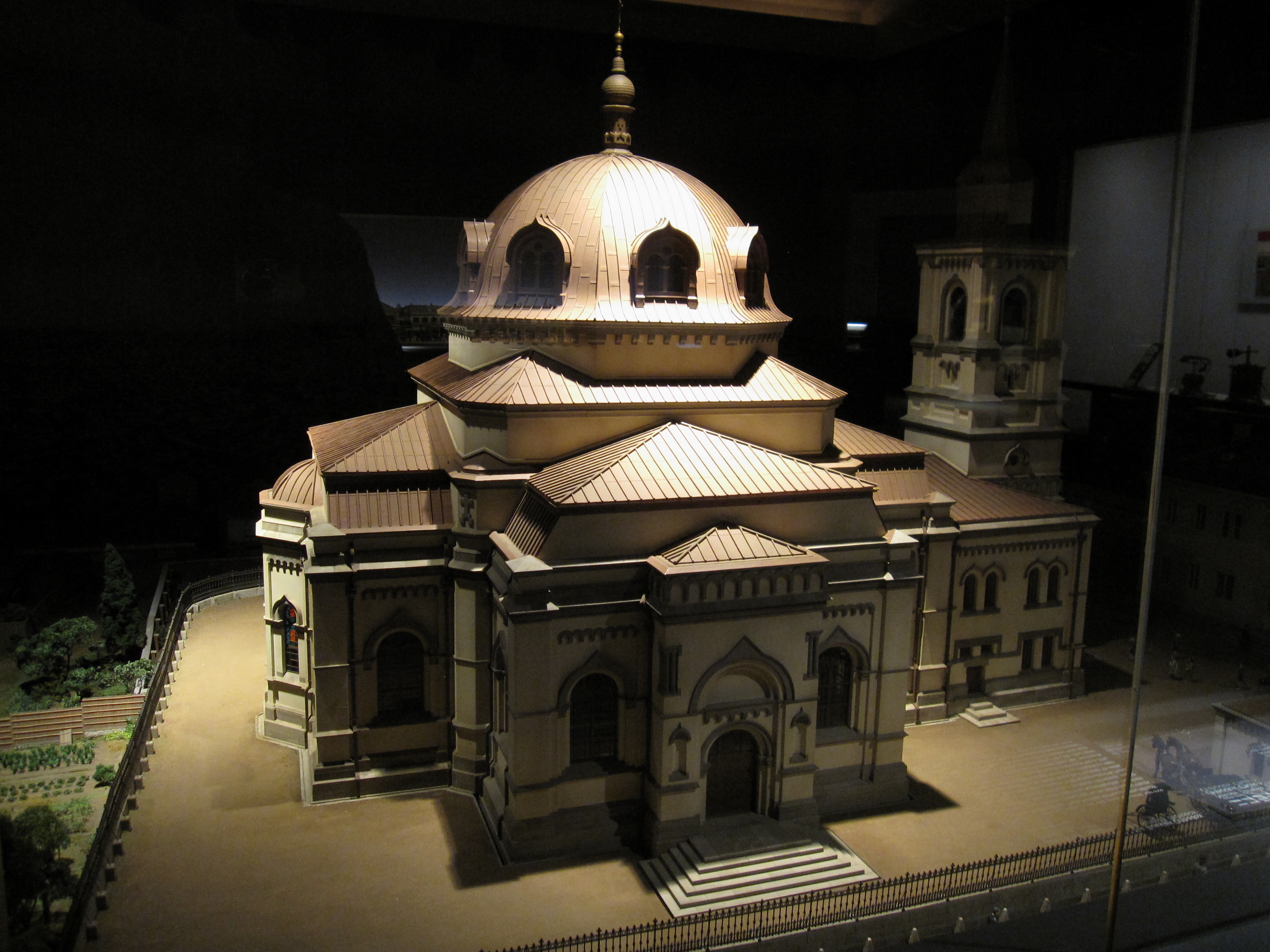
1/25 architectural model of Tokyo Resurrection Cathedral as it appeared in the 1890s in Edo-Tokyo Museum

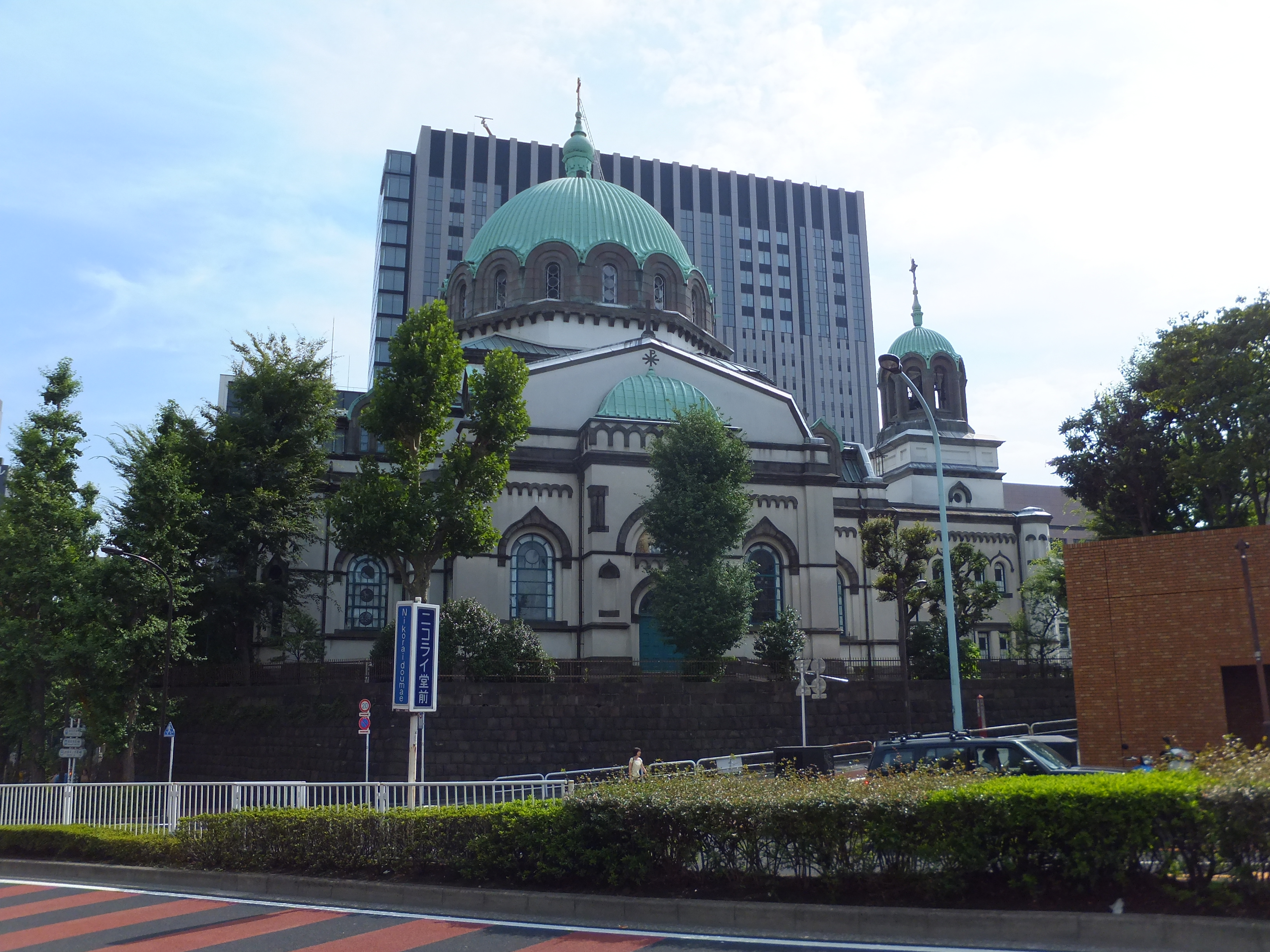
Cathedral in 2013
