= Orthodox Church in Japan =

Russian Orthodox Church of Orthodox Church in Japan 日本ハリストス正教会
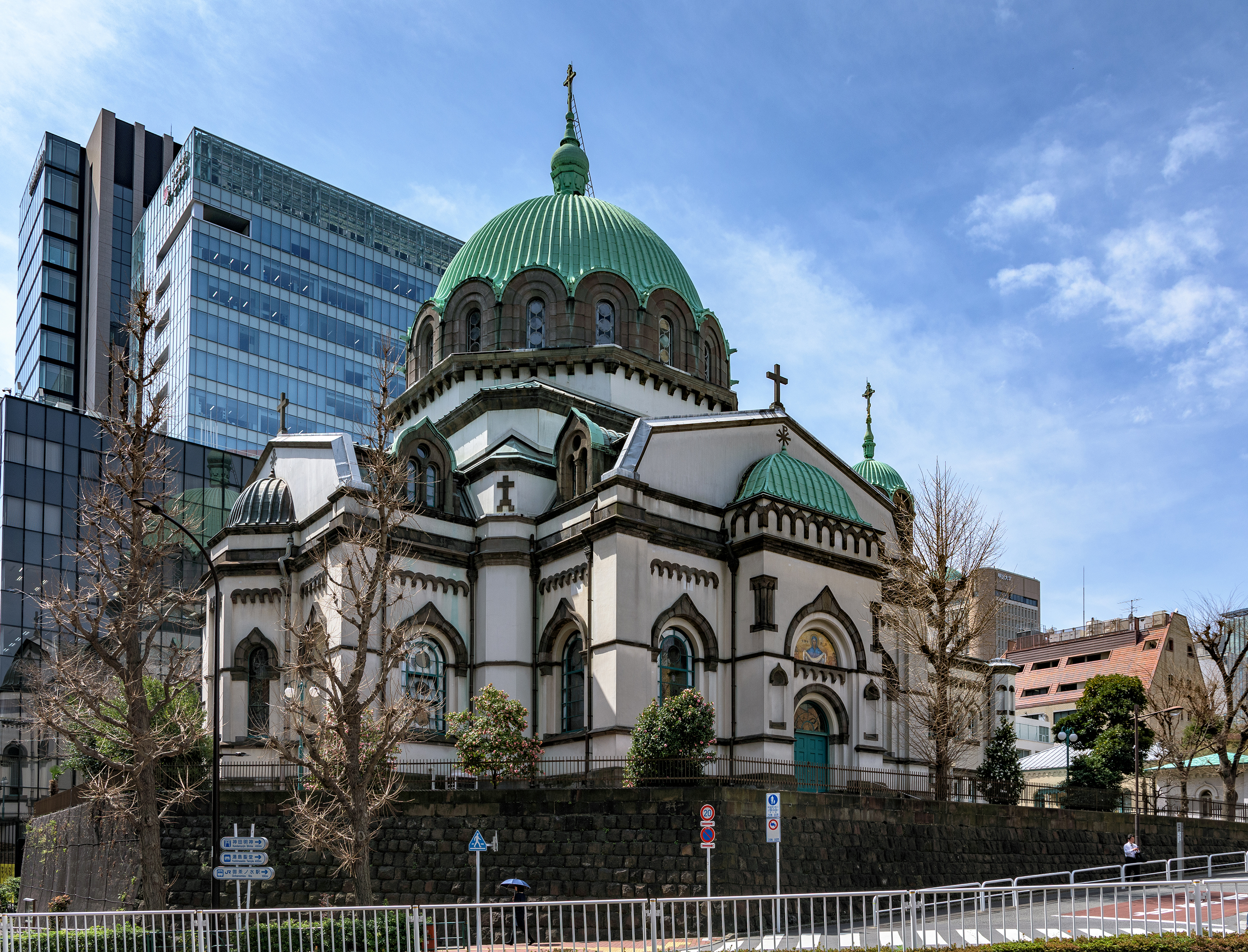
- Holy Resurrection Cathedral in Tokyo

Location
- Country: Japan
- Territory: Japan
- Headquarters: Tokyo, Japan

Statistics
- Population: Total: 9,249 (2021)

Information
- Denomination: Eastern Orthodox
- Sui iuris church: Autonomous Orthodox Church within the jurisdiction of the Moscow Patriarchate (the status of autonomy not recognized by the Ecumenical Patriarchate of Constantinople)
- Established: 10 April 1970 by the Moscow Patriarchate
- Language: Classical Japanese

Current leadership
- Metropolitan of All Japan and Archbishop of Tokyo: Seraphim (Tsujie)

Website
- www.orthodoxjapan.jp

The Orthodox Church in Japan or Orthodox Church of Japan (Japanese: 日本ハリストス正教会, romanized: Nihon Harisutosu Seikyōkai, OCJ), also known as the Japanese Orthodox Church (Russian: Японская православная церковь, romanized: Yaponskaya pravoslavnaya tserkov'), is an autonomous Eastern Orthodox church within the jurisdiction of the Moscow Patriarchate. ハリストス (Harisutosu) is a transcription from the Russian word for "Christ", Христос (Khristos).

== History ==
=== Early Orthodox Christianity ===
The first purpose-built Orthodox Christian church to open in Japan was the wooden Russian Consulate chapel of the Resurrection of Christ, in Hakodate, Hokkaidō, consecrated in October 1860.

In July 1861, the young Russian Hieromonk Nikolay (Kassatkin) (subsequently canonized and known as Nicholas of Japan), arrived in Hakodate to serve at the consulate as a priest. He became the first to learn the local language and customs sufficiently to spread Orthodox Christianity amongst the local populace. Though the shōgun's government at the time prohibited Japanese from converting to Christianity, some locals who frequented the chapel did convert in 1864. One of Kassatkin's first converts was a Samurai, named Sawabe (later, the first native Japanese Orthodox priest). These early converts acted as missionaries amongst their own families and community. While they were Kassatkin's first converts in Japan, they were not the first Japanese to become Orthodox Christians: some Japanese who had settled in Russia had converted to Orthodox Christianity earlier. On Kassatkin's initiative, the Russian Imperial government established the Russian Spiritual Mission to Japan in 1870. Kassatkin's early approach to spreading Orthodox Christianity throughout Japan involved a degree of indigenization. Kassatkin searched for the points of religious union between Orthodox Christianity and Buddhism and Shinto. It was envisioned by Kassatkin that the Orthodox Church would be the state religion of Japan, an institution to serve the state and to protect Japanese culture from Western influence.

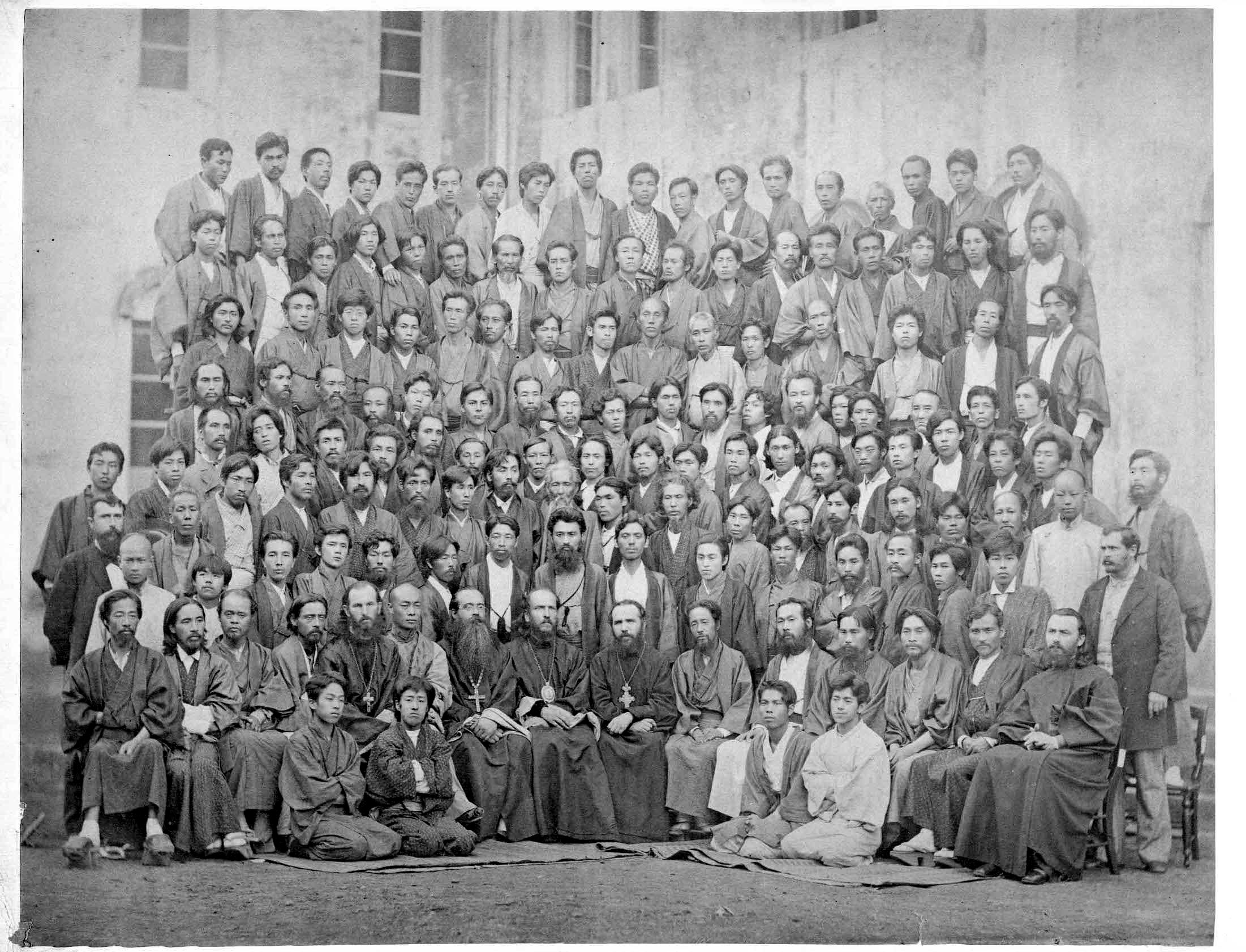
1882 council of the Orthodox Church in Japan

Kassatkin moved to Tokyo in 1872; he remained in Japan for most of the time until his death in 1912, even during the Russo-Japanese War of 1904–1905. He was consecrated bishop in the Alexander Nevsky Lavra in Saint Petersburg in the Russian Empire in March 1880 (initially with the title of auxiliary bishop of Reval; he became Archbishop of Tokyo and Japan from March 1906). Kassatkin travelled across Russia to collect funds for the construction of the Orthodox Cathedral in Tokyo, which was inaugurated in Kanda district in 1891 and went on to be known after him as Nikorai-do. Nikolay Kassatkin made Japanese translations of the New Testament and of some liturgical books (Lenten Triodion, Pentecostarion, Feast Services, Book of Psalms, Irmologion).

By the end of 1890, as reported by Kassatkin, the Orthodox Church in Japan (the Russian Spiritual Mission to Japan) had 18,625 baptized faithful.

=== 20th century ===
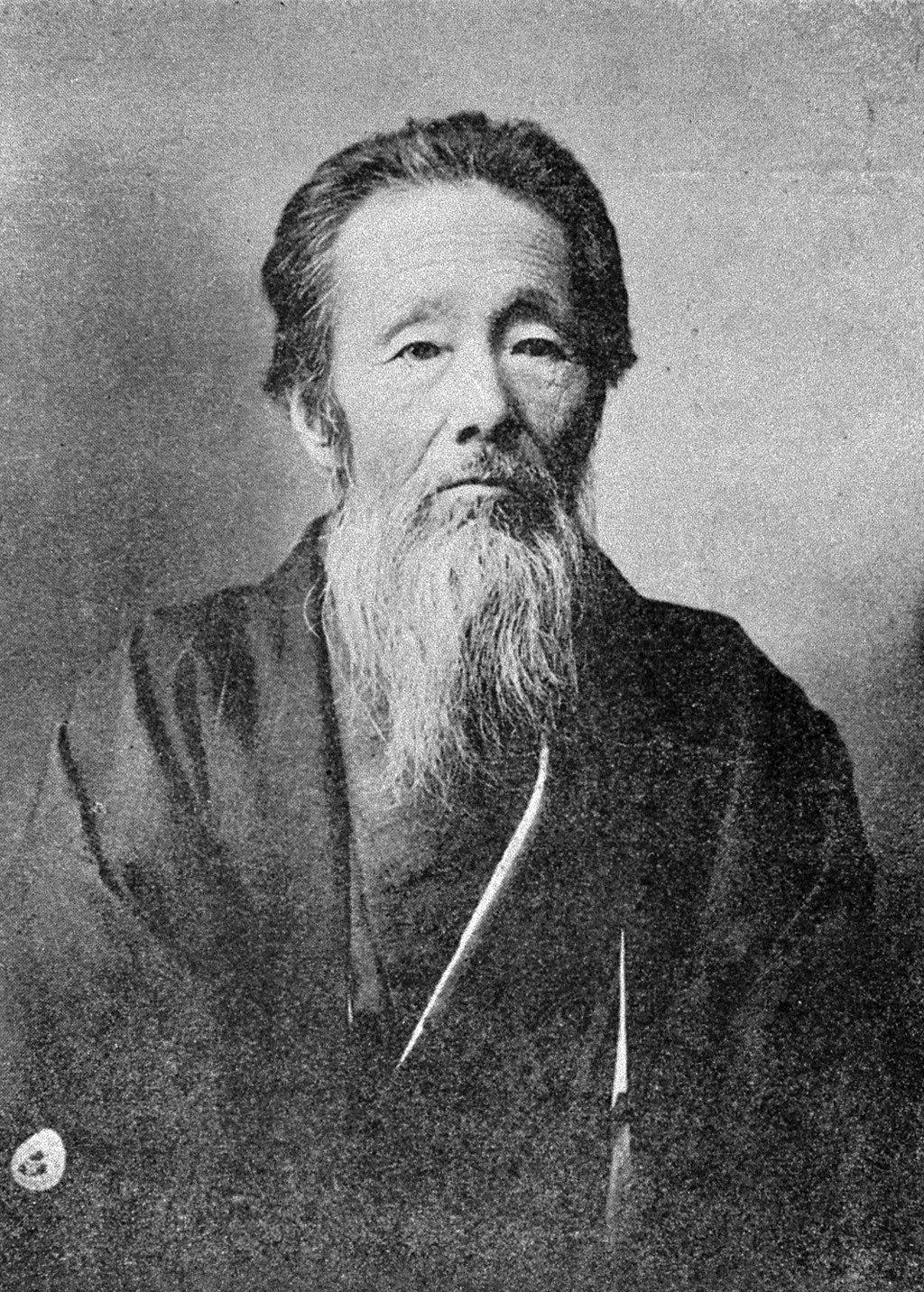
Sawabe Takuma (1833–1913) was a Japanese samurai and later an Orthodox Christian priest.

The Russo-Japanese War (1904–1905) created a politically difficult situation for the Orthodox Church in Japan. Although Kassatkin remained in Japan, he withdrew from public prayer as Orthodox liturgy required that prayers include blessings for the Japanese armed forces who at the time, were at war with Russia. Throughout the war, the Orthodox Church attended to the spiritual needs of 73,000 Russian POWs held prisoner by Japan. The POWs showed their gratitude by building a number of chapels for the Orthodox Church. Throughout this period, the church grew and by 1912, the Orthodox Church in Japan had some 33,017 members, organized into 266 congregations.

After the Russian Revolution of 1917, communications with and support from the Church in Russia (in the USSR from 1922) diminished greatly. The Japanese government had new suspicions about the Japanese Orthodox Church; in particular fearing that the Soviets used it as a cover for espionage. The second bishop of Japan (from 1912), Sergius (Tikhomirov), was one of a handful of Russian émigré bishops who remained loyal to the USSR-based Moscow Patriarchate (rather than supporting the Yugoslavia-based ROCOR). From the late 1920s communion with the Moscow Patriarchate automatically implied loyalty to the government of the USSR—the Japanese government according treated Metropolitan Sergius with suspicion, and he was forced to resign his position in September 1940.

The Great Kantō earthquake in 1923 did serious damage to the Japanese Orthodox Church. The headquarters, Nikorai-do, was destroyed and burnt, including its library with many valuable documents. Nikorai-do was rebuilt in 1929 thanks to contributions gathered from the faithful, whom metropolitan Sergius visited nationwide.

During the Sino-Japanese War of 1937–1945, which merged into World War II (1939 to 1945), Christians in Japan—and especially the Orthodox Church—suffered severe conditions. During the war the Japanese Orthodox Church had had almost no foreign contact. Following the surrender of Japan (August 1945), the Allied occupation regime had a benevolent attitude toward Christian groups, given their predominantly American connections. As the majority of the Slavic- and Greek-Americans would attend local Orthodox Christian parishes and more Russian refugees began to arrive in Japan—fleeing the Communist regime in China—the Orthodox Christian community in Japan revived. In 1946, the precursor to the Orthodox Church in America (OCA), the Metropolia (a de facto independent jurisdiction at the time), on the initiative of U.S. Army Colonel Boris Pash, took steps to prevent the Moscow Patriarchate from re-establishing its control over the Japanese Church—despite the vigorous efforts Moscow undertook to this end. The following year the Japanese Church largely switched to come under the Metropolia′s jurisdiction, and would be governed by bishops sent from the U.S. by the Metropolia until March 1972. Several Japanese youths who would study at the Metroplia's Saint Vladimir’s Orthodox Theological Seminary, then in New York City, would subsequently become leaders (primates) of the Japanese Church.

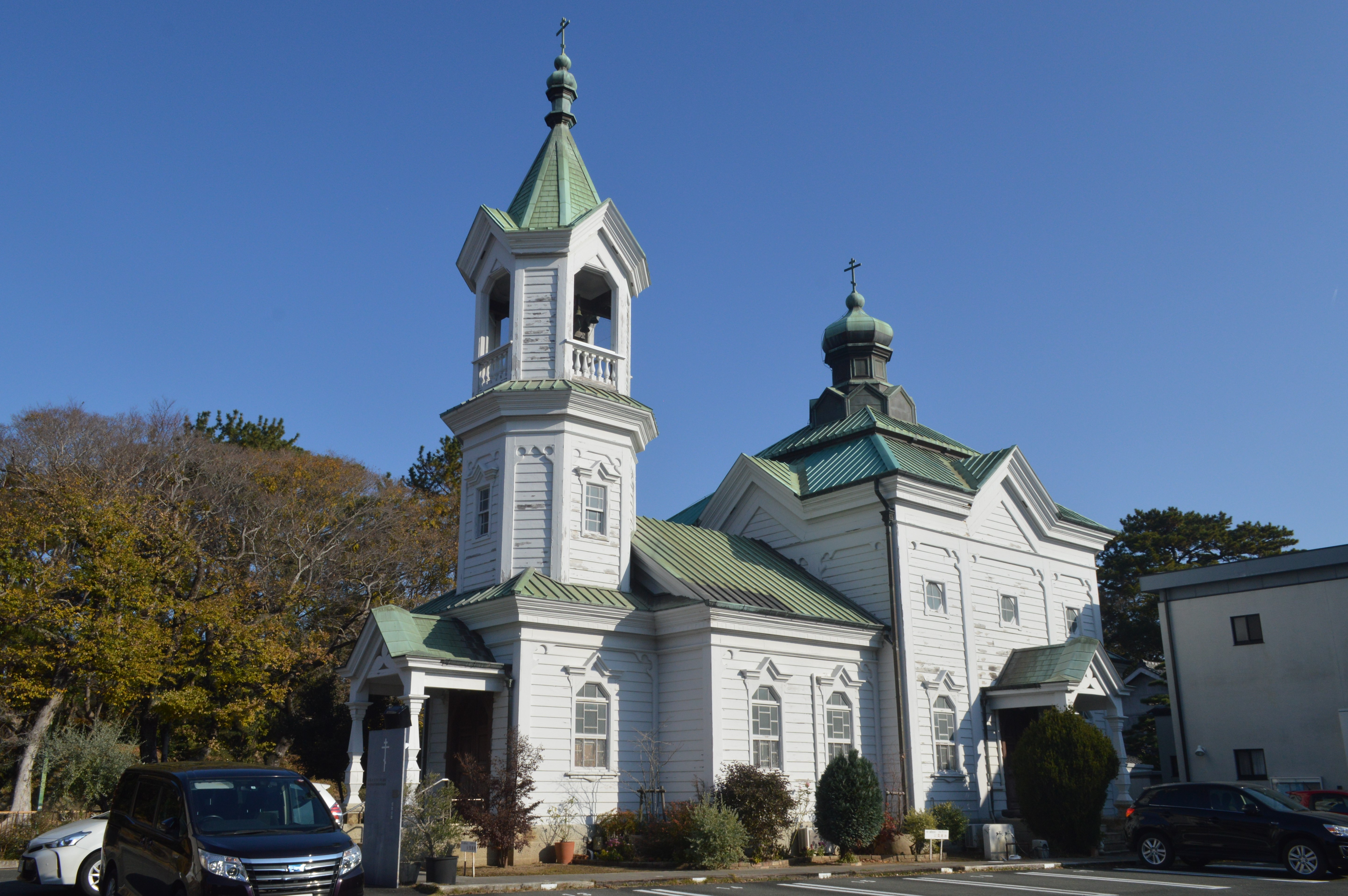
Toyohashi Orthodox Church

As the Metroplia in the late 1960s gradually restored relations with the Moscow Patriarchate (whose external activity was fully controlled and guided by the Soviet government and specifically by the KGB) with a view to obtaining autocephaly (i. e. legitimate administrative independence), the Japanese Church transferred to Russian Orthodox Church jurisdiction. On 10 April 1970, a few days prior to the death of Russian Patriarch Alexius I, the Moscow Patriarchate canonised Nikolay (Kassatkin) as part of a package deal of granting autocephaly to the OCA and re-establishing control over the Church of Japan. The Ecumenical Patriarchate of Constantinople strongly condemned the act of granting autocephaly by the Moscow Patriarchate as violating canon law.

In March 1972, Metropolitan Vladimir (Nagosky) left for the United States, and on March 19, 1972, Theodosius (Nagashima) was elected the new primate.

In 1973, the Orthodox Church of Japan became a member of the World Council of Churches.

=== 21st century ===
In 2005 the first Orthodox Christian male monastic house of the Japanese Autonomous Orthodox Church opened in Tokyo near Holy Resurrection Cathedral (Nikolai-do). The abbot of the monastic community, Hieromonk Gerasimus (Shevtsov) of the Troitse-Sergiyeva Lavra, dispatched by the Holy Synod of the Moscow Patriarchate, arrived in Japan at the end of 2005. He is currently the Archbishop of Vladikavkaz and Alania.

== Current administrative organization and statistics ==
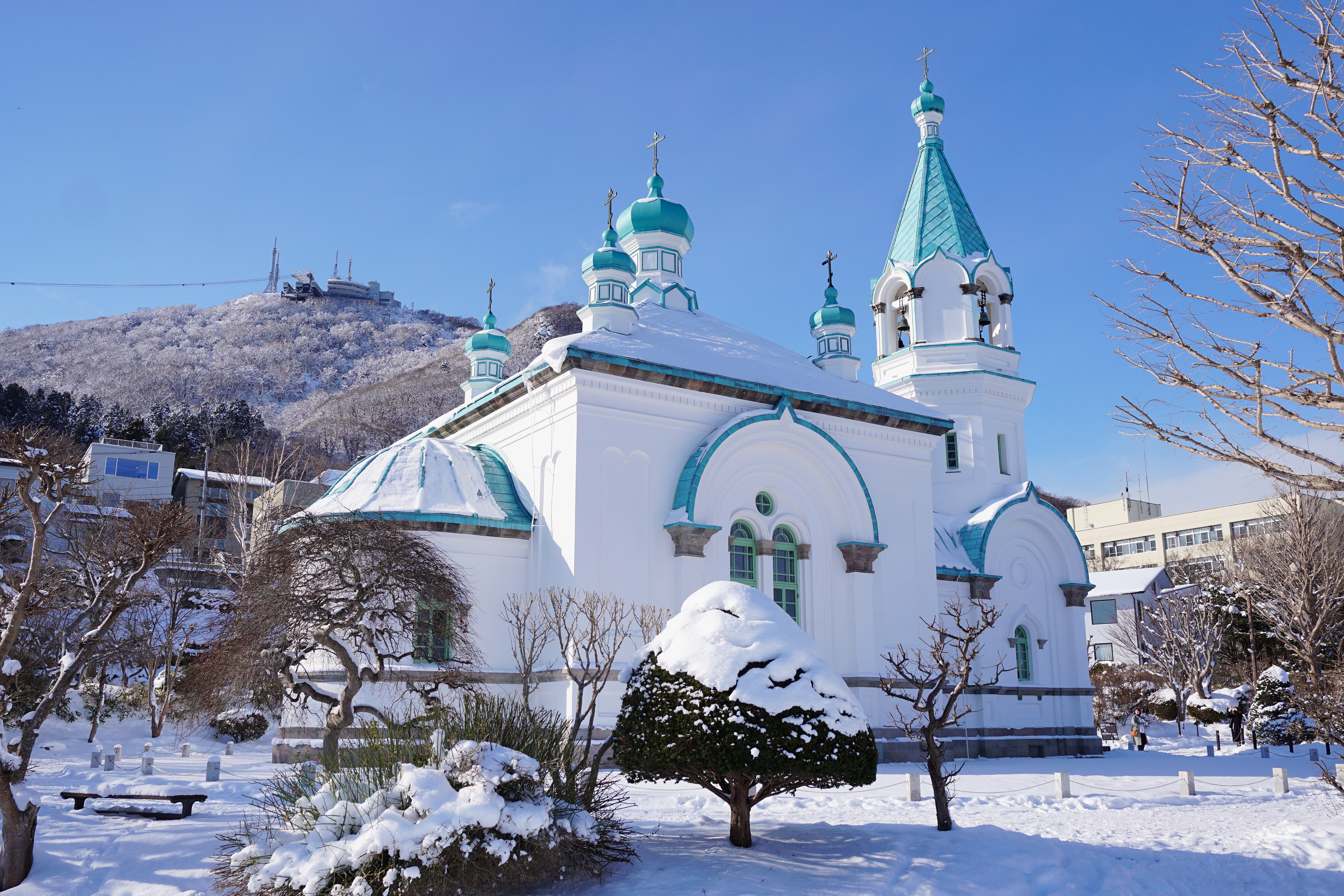
Holy Resurrection Orthodox Church of Hakodate

The Orthodox Church in Japan has four dioceses:

- Holy Resurrection Cathedral (Tokyo)
- Sendai Orthodox Church (Sendai)
- Kyoto Orthodox Church (Kyoto)
- Holy Resurrection Church of Hakodate (Hakodate)

The Primate of the Orthodox Church in Japan was Daniel (Nushiro), Metropolitan of All Japan and Archbishop of Tokyo (from May 2000 until his death in August 2023). Before becoming Archbishop of Tokyo and Metropolitan of all Japan, Daniel had been bishop of Kyoto and since 2001 he had been also in charge of the Kyoto diocese as locum tenens. Bishop Seraphim Tsujie was appointed acting Archbishop.

As of the end of 2014, according to the data provided by the Ministry of Culture of Japan, the church had a total of 67 parishes (communities), 37 clergymen, and 9,619 followers (registered members).

The Orthodox Church in Japan runs the Tokyo Orthodox Seminary. The seminary accepts only male faithfuls and gives a three-year theological education to those who expect to become ordained presbyters and missionaries. The Seminary also publishes a monthly journal, Seikyo Jiho.

The Orthodox Church in Japan publishes religious books, including the Japanese Orthodox translation of the New Testament and Psalms and liturgical texts, available as texts alone or with musical scores. Its headquarters in Tokyo and local parishes publish brochures for the faithful looking for further religious education.

As of the end of 2021, according to the data provided by the Ministry of Culture of Japan, the church had a total of 64 parishes (communities), 25 clergymen, and 9,249 followers (registered members).

== Liturgy ==
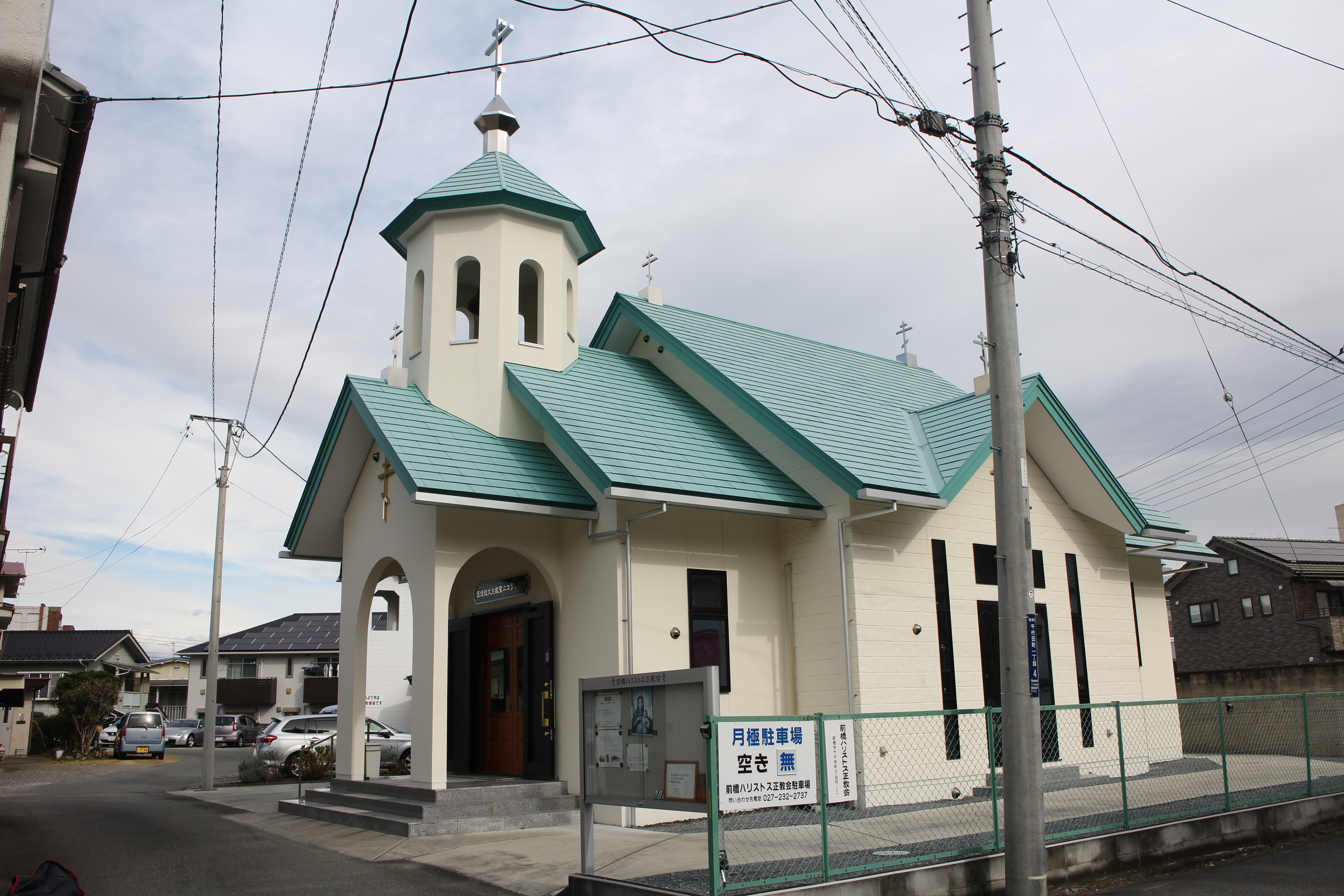
Maebashi Orthodox Church

The Orthodox Church in Japan celebrates its liturgy in Japanese, and occasionally in other languages such as Church Slavonic or Greek. As many liturgical and Biblical texts were first translated into Japanese by Archbishop Nicolas and Nakai Tsugumaro, a Japanese Christian scholar of literary Chinese, their Japanese today reads archaically.

The liturgical style found in the community of the Orthodox Church in Japan remains influenced by that of the church in late-19th-century Russia.

== Notable adherents ==
- Cary-Hiroyuki Tagawa
- Chiune Sugihara
- Kohno Michisei
- Yamashita Rin
- Petros Sasaki

== See also ==
- Holy Resurrection Cathedral
- Christianity in Japan
