= 2004 Summer Olympics opening ceremony =

- Part of 2004 Summer Olympics
- Date: 13 August 2004; 22 years ago
- Time: 20:45 – 0:21 EEST (UTC+3)
- Venue: Olympic Stadium
- Location: Marousi, Athens, Greece; 38°2′10″N 23°47′15″E
- Also known as: Birthplace
- Filmed by: Athens Olympic Broadcasting (AOB)
- Footage: Athens 2004 Opening Ceremony – Full Length on YouTube

The opening ceremony of the 2004 Summer Olympics was held on 13 August 2004 starting at 20:45 EEST (UTC+3) at the Olympic Stadium in Marousi, Greece, a suburb of Athens. As mandated by the Olympic Charter, the proceedings combined the formal and ceremonial opening of this international sporting event, including welcoming speeches, hoisting of the flags and the parade of athletes, with an artistic spectacle to showcase the host nation's culture and history. 72,000 spectators (with nearly 50 world leaders) attended the event, with approximately 15,000 athletes from 202 countries participating in the ceremony as well. It marked the first-ever international broadcast of high-definition television, undertaken by the U.S. media conglomerate NBC Universal and the Japanese broadcaster NHK. The Games were officially opened by President of the Hellenic Republic Konstantinos Stephanopoulos at 23:46 EEST (UTC+3).

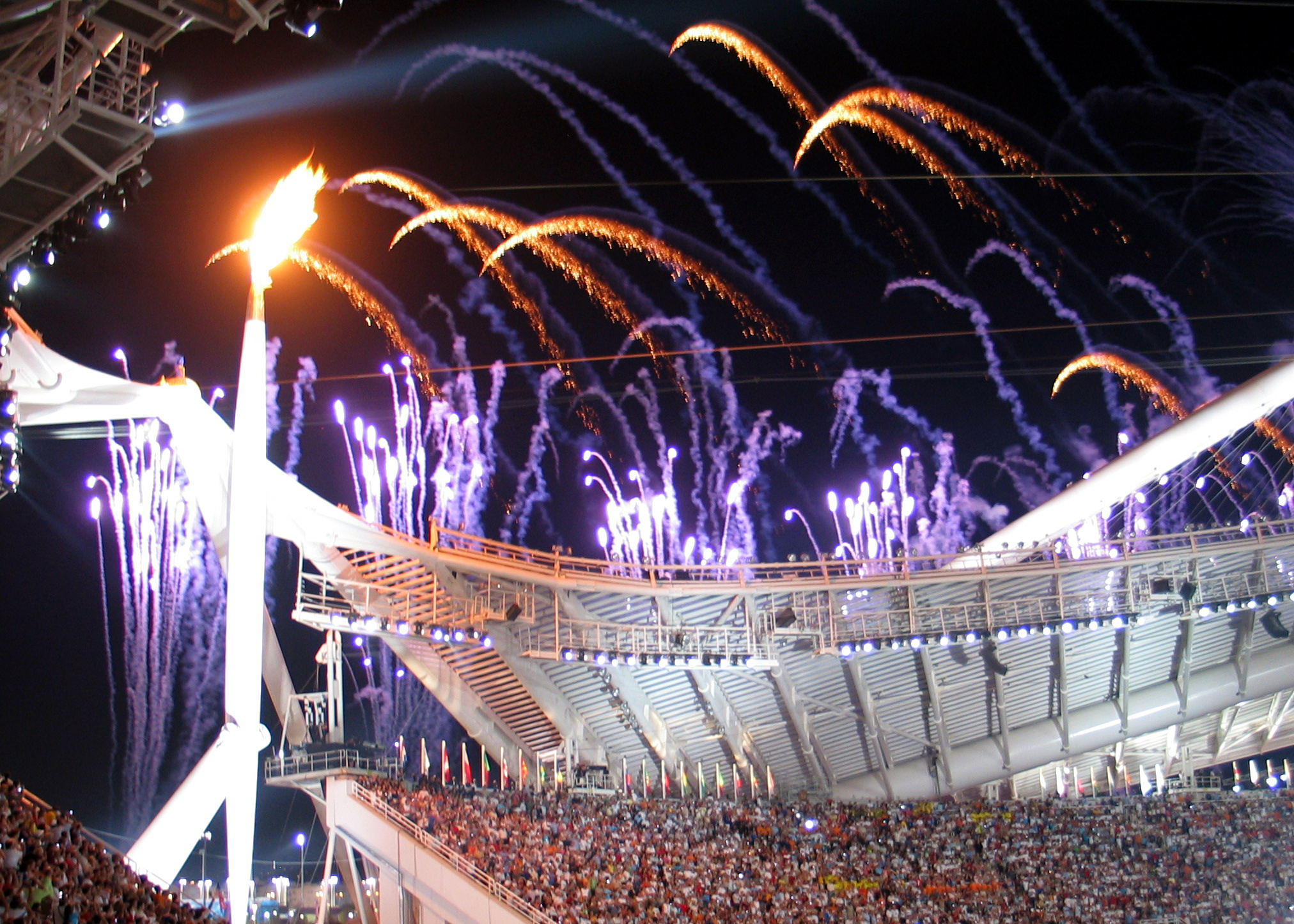
Fireworks

== Proceedings ==
=== Countdown and Welcome ===
The opening ceremony began with a 28-second countdown—one second per Olympics held since Athens last hosted the first modern games, paced by the sounds of an amplified heartbeat. At the end of the countdown, fireworks were set off.

Four hundred percussionists performed the zeimbekiko before marching around the edge of the flooded stadium grounds, accompanied by a 50-person strong bouzouki band. The performance was led by two drummers, one inside the stadium and one projected on the stadium screen from the ancient stadium of Olympia, the locale of the Olympic games in antiquity. On screen was Petros Kourtis, with Nikos Hatzidavitidis responding live at the ceremony. A blazing comet, seemingly coming from the ancient stadium of Olympia, lands on the flooded stadium floor drawing the Olympic Rings with its fire. The comet symbolizes the fire of the ancients giving life to the modern Olympic movement, thus bridging the past and the present together. According to Dimitris Papaioannou, the event "was a pageant of traditional Greek culture and history harkening back to its mythological beginnings, and viewed through the progression of Greek art."

Next, a young Greek boy, Michalis Patsatzis, sailed into the stadium on a giant paper boat waving the host nation's flag, symbolizing Greece's maritime tradition and its close connection to the sea. The Hellenic Naval Band then walks into the stadium. The President of the Athens Organizing Committee for the Olympic Games (ATHOC), Gianna Angelopoulos-Daskalaki, and President of the International Olympic Committee Jacques Rogge walk onto the stadium floor. The Band then performs the Presidential fanfare, where President of the Hellenic Republic Konstantinos Stephanopoulos then also arrives on the stadium floor. The three presidents meet the young boy, before Hymn to Liberty, the Greek national anthem was performed a cappella with the raising of the Greek Flag.

=== Artistic section ===
The segments that followed were divided in two main parts. The first part of the main artistic segment of the opening ceremony was called "Allegory." "Allegory" introduced the main conceptual themes and ideals that are going to be omnipresent throughout the entire opening ceremony, such as the confluence of the past and present, love and passion as the progenitors of history, and humanity's attempt to understand itself. The second part, called the "Clepsydra," or "Hourglass," celebrates the themes introduced in the "Allegory" section through a portrayal of Greek history from the ancient to the modern times.

==== Allegory ====
The "Allegory" segment begins with a recitation of a verse from Nobel Prize-winning Greek poet George Seferis' poem "Mythistorema 3." As the verse is being recited on the speakers, the spotlights are focused upon a woman clad in a black gown looking out to the water. Holding a marble sculpture head, the woman seems to be entering into a dream. As she looks into the dark water, a centaur appears whose human and animal parts supposedly symbolize the duality of spirit and body. The centaur then walks about and then throws a spear of light into the center of the stadium, from which a giant statue that exemplifies Cycladic art (and thus one of the first depictions of the human form in Greek art) emerges. This Cycladic head also represents one of the first attempts of humanity to understand itself. With the use of lasers, geometrical shapes and other scientific images (such as a stylistic representation of the Solar System) are displayed on the figure's face. The statue then breaks into pieces that float away, and from within it emerges a smaller kouros statue from the Archaic Period of Greek sculpture, which in turn breaks apart to reveal the depiction of man in a sculpture of the classical period, symbolizing the dawn of individuality and extolling human scale, one of the principal themes of the 2004 Olympics. At the end of this sequence, a cube arises from the water, and a man starts slowly balancing himself on the rotating cube while representations of humankind's greatest achievements, contrasted to humanistic representations and images of people of various ethnicities and ages, are projected onto the pieces of broken sculpture, which seem to be floating above the water. This last sequence is meant to symbolize the birth of logical thought, higher learning, and humanity finally making sense of the world in which it lives. After this sequence, the pieces of sculpture descend to the water, meant to symbolize the Greek isles.

==== Clepsydra ====
Generations of people come one after the other; changing like the leaves of the trees. (Note: This quote was printed as is from the Media Guide. The actual quote from the Iliad is commonly translated as "Like the generations of leaves, the lives of mortal men. Now the wind scatters the old leaves across the earth, now the living timber bursts with the new buds and spring comes round again. And so with men: as one generation comes to life, another dies away.")

— Homer, The Iliad

In the next sequence, Eros, the Greek god of love, is introduced flying over a pair of lovers (a man and a woman) frolicking in the pool of water located in the center of the stadium. The young couple along with Eros symbolize the fact that the humanity which creates and shapes history is born out of love and passion. This segment introduces the next part of the ceremony, the "Clepsydra," which highlights the themes of the opening ceremony through a celebration of Greek history. The lovers then lie down in the water, and both fall into a dream state. Throughout the rest of the scenes from history and mythology, Eros flies over the parade, occasionally touching or stepping on the floats moving beneath him, thus reinforcing the theme of love and passion as the source for all history.

The pageantry following the statues and the introduction of Eros continues to portray scenes that show the sequence of Greek civilization through its art. The scenes start with the Minoan civilization. The first float features the iconic image of Minoan civilization: that of the fertility goddess clad in a bodice exposing her breasts and clutching serpents in both hands. The subsequent floats then feature scenes of bull-jumping, dolphins, and other elements that harken back to the images in the frescoes of Phaistos. The scenes then proceed to the more stark art of the Mycenean civilisation, followed by representations of the Classical period. A chariot carrying an actor portraying Alexander the Great introduces images from the Hellenistic period, which in turn are followed by representations of Byzantine art, the Greek War of Independence, and lastly of 20th century elements of Greek culture, such as the popular shadow-theatre figure Karagiozis, who is said to be a humorous and self-deprecating depiction (and parody) of Greek mentality.

At the end of the parade, "Eros" lowered enough to help a pregnant woman remove her outer garment. This last part represents the ceremony coming into full circle: the "Clepsydra" segment began with the image of the Minoan fertility goddess and is now ending with a pregnant woman representing the future of all humanity and history. With belly glowing, the woman moves into the lake of water as the stadium's lights dim and lights underneath the pool of water turn on, thus creating an image of stars in a galaxy. According to Greek myth, the stars of the galaxy were born out of the milk of Hera's fertile breasts. In fact, the name for the Milky Way Galaxy, the home to planet Earth, was born out of this myth. Slowly the stars rise around the woman, and move to form a rapidly rotating DNA double helix, which is the basis for all life on the planet. Humanity's attempt to understand itself, a theme that has been omnipresent throughout the entire ceremony beginning with the Cycladic head, is further reinforced by the representation of the DNA double helix, which symbolizes humanity's latest and most recent attempt to understand itself: the late 20th and early 21st centuries witnessed great advances in the field of genetics with the mapping of the human genome.

Finally, all the characters of the parade begin to walk inside the pool, around its center, mixing the past and the present in a single marching beat of the drums. The confluence of the past and the present is another main theme of the opening ceremony. The music begins a crescendo with choruses, when all of a sudden an olive tree is lifted from the center of the pool—symbolizing goddess Athena's preferred gift by the Greeks—land and food—over Poseidon's gift, the horse—a tool of warfare. At the music's climax, all the characters stop and raise their arms as if worshipping the Tree, which is high above, surrounded also by the fragments of the deconstructed statues who resemble a mount.

=== Parade of Nations ===
In order to prepare for the entry of the athletes to the stadium, the giant pool of water that had been constructed on the floor of the stadium had to first be drained. 2,162,000 liters of water were drained from the stadium in a time period of three minutes, providing a dry, hard surface for the athletes to march and gather on.

Typically, Greece leads the Parade of Nations in any Olympics, with the host nation entering the stadium last. However, since Greece was the host nation, they went last, sending only their flag with the weightlifter Pyrros Dimas as the flag bearer into the stadium at the beginning of the parade, and the athletes themselves at the end of it.

The debut position was given to Saint Lucia (Αγία Λουκία in Greek), who led the Parade of Nations into the stadium. As the nations entered in Greek alphabetical order, Zimbabwe (Ζιμπάμπουε in Greek)—which has usually been the penultimate nation, followed only by the host country—appeared in the middle of the parade. Countries such as the United States and Switzerland, which are usually at the rear of the pack, were granted earlier entries as well due to their position in the Greek alphabet.

The entrances of Afghanistan and Iraq were emotional high points of the parade. The nation of Kiribati made its debut Olympic appearance at the 2004 Summer Olympics, and East Timor marched under its own flag for the first time. Serbia and Montenegro appeared at the Olympics under the nation's new name for the first time since the country was officially renamed in 2003, its only time at the Summer Olympics prior to the union's dissolution in 2006 (just after the 2006 Winter Olympics); it had previously been known as Yugoslavia.

Due to the unpopularity of the American-led invasion of Iraq among Greeks, it had been expected by the media that audience members would protest against the war during the entrance of the American delegation into the stadium by booing; however, the Americans did receive a warm welcome, much to the pleasant surprise of US news anchors covering the event as well as NBC Sports anchor Bob Costas. NBC's coverage of the Olympics has been praised, and the company was awarded with six Emmy Awards for its coverage of the Games and technical production. Additionally, NBC televised all 28 sports in the 2004 Games, becoming the first broadcaster to do so.

Apart from Greece, the Greek crowd reserved some of their loudest cheers for their fellow Greeks from Cyprus, Australia (home to many Greeks and site of the previous Summer Olympics) and Mediterranean countries such as France and Italy, as well as for Brazil and Canada. A loud cheer was also given for Djibouti, because it had only one person enter the stadium. The teams from Palestine and Serbia and Montenegro were also very warmly welcomed. Cheers greeted Portugal, the nation that hosted the UEFA Euro 2004, which Greece won beating Portugal in the final match by 1–0.

High-ranking politicians and royalty from all around the world applauded as the teams from their respective countries paraded by. Important guests such as U.K. Prime Minister Tony Blair, Italian President Carlo Azeglio Ciampi, Crown Prince Haakon of Norway (who lit the Cauldron for the 1994 Winter Olympics), and Crown Prince Frederik of Denmark, (among others) each stood and applauded the teams from their countries. Past world leaders, including U.S. President George H. W. Bush, also attended and applauded their national teams during the parade, in which DJ Tiësto played trance music.

=== Oceania – A Song for the Athletes ===
Björk then sang her song Oceania. The song was written at the ocean's point of view, from which the singer believes all life emerged, and details the human's evolution, whilst accompanied by a choir. While she sang, her dress slowly covered the athletes with a white sheet. At the end of the song, a projection of the world was shown on the dress. However, technical complications with the sheet meant that the sheet didn't reach all the athletes by the end of the song. If the segment succeeded, it would be a call back to the flags covering all athletes in the Olympic opening ceremonies of 1992 and 2000.

A video from the International Space Station Expedition 9 crew then played, with Russian Commander Gennady Padalka and United States Flight Engineer Michael Fincke welcoming the athletes and stressing the importance for human collaboration between countries for peace.

=== 108 Years of Olympic Games ===
After introducing the founders of the Modern Olympic Games, Pierre de Coubertin and Demetrios Vikelas and the first games in 1896, runner Giorgos Sabanis carries a flag with an image of an olive branch symbolizing not only peace but Athens itself, lapped around the stadium, symbolically crossing tape dedicated to the previous 27 Olympiads. The runner symbolically stumbles at the 1916 Games which were cancelled due to World War I, and then again at 1940 and 1944 Games, which were both cancelled due to World War II. The runner ended his run at the very center of the stadium, where the olive tree from the artistic section has appeared, symbolizing the Modern Olympic Games journey around the world, and coming back home to Athens.

While not officially part of the Olympic protocol, there has been a recognition of past host cities at some Opening Ceremonies. For the Summer Olympics, a recognition has appeared in the 1992 opening ceremony in Barcelona, 1996 opening ceremony in Atlanta and a reduced versions at the 2012 opening ceremony in London and at the 2024 opening ceremony in Paris. In the Winter Olympics, there has been a recognition in 2002 Winter Olympics in Salt Lake City, where banners of the previous 18 Winter Olympics entered Rice-Eccles Stadium at the beginning of the ceremony, 2006 Winter Olympics in Turin and the 2010 Winter Olympics in Vancouver and the 2022 Winter Olympics in Beijing.

=== Opening addresses ===
Two short speeches were delivered in front of the olive tree, a traditional Greek and Olympic symbol. The first speech came from Gianna Angelopoulos-Daskalaki, the President of the Athens Organizing Committee for the Olympic Games (ATHOC), and the first female chief organizer of an Olympic Games. Angelopoulos-Daskalaki offered a message of welcome to the Athletes of the World in Greek and English: "Καλως ΗΡΘΑΤΕ!" translates into English as "Welcome! Welcome to the Games of the XXVIII Olympiad. Welcome to a unique Olympic Homecoming." She told the athletes in Greek: "Η Ελλάδα είναι εδώ. Είμαστε έτοιμοι." which translates into English as "Greece is here. We're ready" and also stated, "Ολυμπιακοί Αγώνες, Καλώς ήρθατε." (in Greek), "Jeux olympiques, bienvenue." (in French), and "Olympic Games, Welcome home!" (in English). She also stated the people of Greece "have waited long for this moment," alluding to the long period between the first modern Olympic Games in Greece and the 2004 Games.

Angelopoulos-Daskalaki was followed by the President of the International Olympic Committee (IOC) Jacques Rogge, who delivered a speech encouraging participating athletes to resist the urge to use banned performance-enhancing substances and "show us that sport unites by overriding national, political, religious, and language barriers". Rogge speaking in Greek stated, "Έχω τώρα την τιμή να καλέσω τον Πρόεδρο της Ελληνικής Δημοκρατίας. Να κηρύξει την Έναρξη των Αγώνων." which translate into English as "I have the honor of inviting the President of the Hellenic Republic. To announce the opening of the Games." Rogge then introduced the President of the Hellenic Republic Konstantinos Stephanopoulos, who declared the games officially open. Stephanopoulos was accompanied by the Adjutant to the President of the Hellenic Republic Colonel Georgios Dritsakos of the Hellenic Air Force, who spoke in Greek saying,

"Κηρύσσω την έναρξη των Ολυμπιακών Αγώνων της Αθήνας...και τον εορτασμό της 28ης Ολυμπιάδος της σύγχρονης εποχής."

— Constantinos Stephanopoulos, President of the Hellenic Republic

which translates into English as "I declare open the Olympic Games of Athens...and the celebration of the XXVIII Olympiad of the modern era."

=== The Olympic Flag, Anthem and Oaths ===
Five bells, each bell representing a continent, then are rung to heralded in the opening the games. The audience also rang their bells given to them. As the bells were rung, children run into the stadium floor holding olive branches. In the midst of their crowd, the Olympic flag made its entrance. It was carried in by eight Greek athletes. They were:

- Petros Galaktopoulos (Greco-Roman wrestling)
- Ilias Hatzipavlis (sailing)
- Niki Bakoyianni (athletics)
- Angelos Basinas (football)
- Leonidas Kokas (weightlifting)
- Michalis Mouroutsos (taekwondo)
- Valerios Leonidis (weightlifting)
- Dimosthenis Tampakos (gymnastics)

They then passed on the flag to the eight sailors of the Hellenic Navy and the Olympic flag was hoist and raised while singing of the Olympic Hymn which the Greek choirs of men and children sang in Greek was conducted by John Psathas.

Greek freestyle swimmer Zoi Dimoschaki gave the Athletes Oath on behalf of all athletes in Greek. Greek basketball referee Lazaros Voreadis delivered the officials oath in Greek.

=== Torch relay and the lighting of the cauldron ===
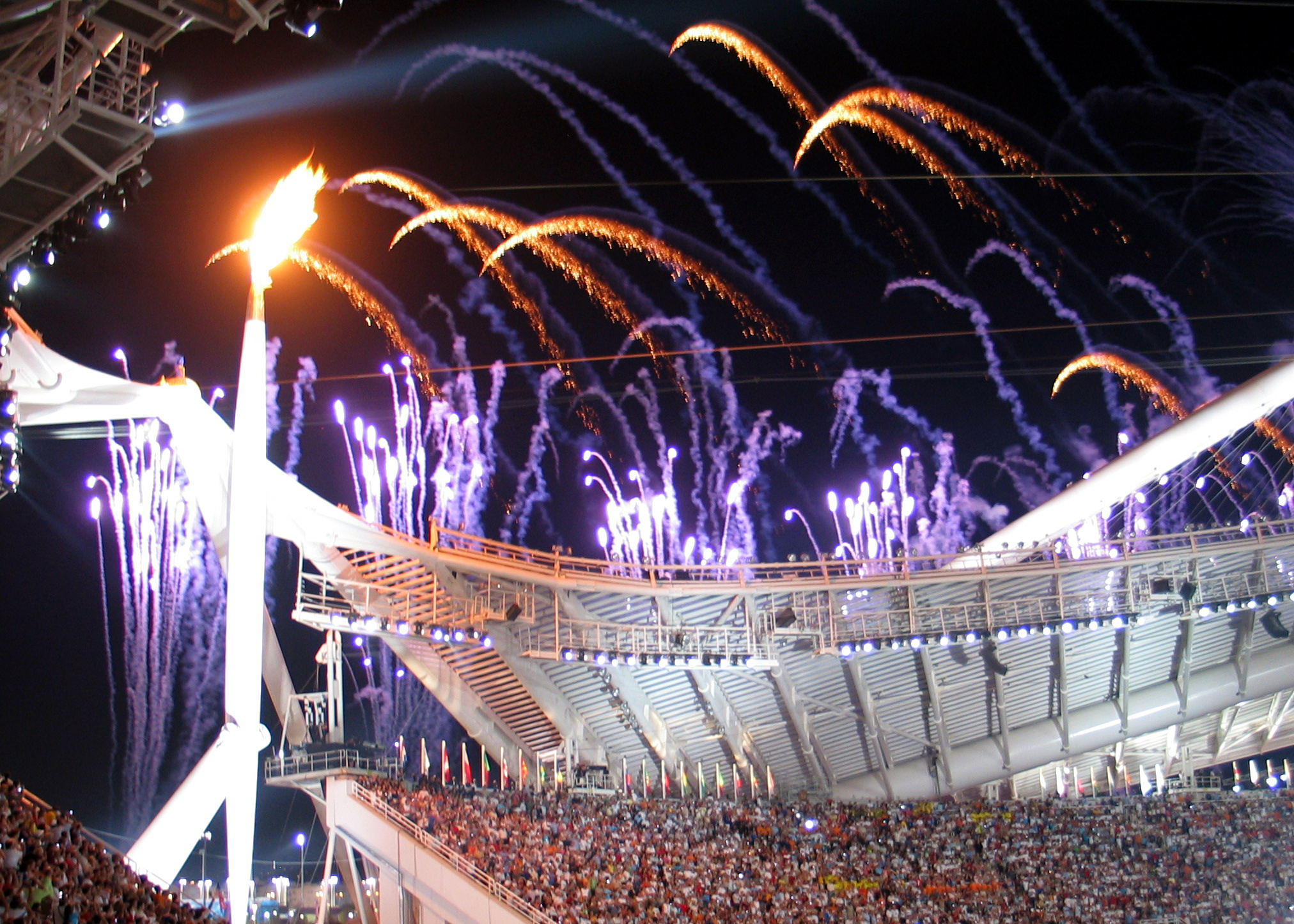
The Olympic flame at the Opening Ceremony. The concept was the work of choreographer and director Dimitris Papaioannou, a modern dance artist.

The Opening Ceremony culminated at the end of the torch relay, a tradition begun when Berlin hosted the games in 1936. This segment preceding the torch's arrival honored the first global torch relay that was begun in Athens. Before the torch came into the stadium, three rings arose from the center of the stadium that simulated a globe. Projections of doves were shown on the globe and on the LED screens as symbol of peace. Then actors, suspended on cables, started rising out of the crowd and ran towards the globe, carrying glowing sticks meant to simulate the Olympic torch. On the globe, the names of the cities which the torch visited were projected, and this segment ended with all the torchbearers floating mid-air coming together at the globe. After this segment ended, the lights were dimmed, and the sound of the heartbeat accompanied by thunderous cheers and applause met the torch's final arrival to the Olympic Stadium.

Torch bearer Nikos Galis, considered to be the greatest Greek basketball player of all time, entered the stadium first. The torch was passed on, in sequential order, to Greek football legend Mimis Domazos, 1992 Hurdles champion Voula Patoulidou, 1996 Olympic weightlifting champion Kakhi Kakhiashvili, and 1996 Olympic gymnastics champion Ioannis Melissanidis.

The torch was finally passed to the 1996 Olympic sailing champion Nikolaos Kaklamanakis, who lit a giant tapered column resembling the Olympic torch – not, as usual, a cauldron – to burn during the duration of the 2004 Summer Olympics. As Kaklamanakis ascended the steps to light the cauldron, the cauldron seemed to bow down to him, symbolizing that despite advance of technology, technology is still a creation and tool of humanity and that it was meant to serve humanity's needs. The ceremony concluded with a breathtaking fireworks display.

== Dignitaries in attendance ==
The ceremony was attended by delegates from 90 countries, which included : 3 kings, 4 princes, 29 presidents and 26 premiers. They included :

=== Dignitaries from International organizations ===
- United Nations –
  - President of the United Nations General Assembly Julian Hunte
  - President of Kosovo Ibrahim Rugova
- UNESCO –
  - Director General of UNESCO Koichiro Matsuura
- European Union –
  - President of the European Commission Romano Prodi
- (Organisation internationale de la Francophonie) Francophonie –
  - Secretary General of Francophonie Boutros Boutros-Ghali
- Commonwealth of Independent States –
  - Secretary General of CIS Vladimir Rushailo
- NATO –
  - Secretary General of NATO Jaap de Hoop Scheffer
- International Olympic Committee –
  - President of the IOC Jacques Rogge and wife Anne Rogge
  - IOC Vice-President Thomas Bach and wife Claudia Bach
  - IOC Vice-President James L. Easton and wife Phyllis Easton
  - IOC Vice-President Vitali Smirnov
  - IOC Member Sergey Bubka and wife Lilia Tutunik
  - predecessor Honorary IOC President for Life Juan Antonio Samaranch
  - and Members of the International Olympic Committee

=== Host nation dignitaries ===
- Greece –
  - President of the Hellenic Republic Konstantinos Stephanopoulos
  - Adjutant to the President of the Hellenic Republic Air Force Colonel Georgios Dritsakos
  - ATHOC President Gianna Angelopoulos-Daskalaki and husband Theodore Angelopoulos
  - ATHOC Vice-President and former President of the Hellenic Olympic Committee Lambis Nikolaou and wife Tonia Nikolaou
  - Prime Minister of Greece and Minister for Culture Kostas Karamanlis and wife Natasa Pazaïti
  - Ex-Prime Minister of Greece Costas Simitis
  - Ex-Prime Minister of Greece Konstantinos Mitsotakis
  - President of the Panhellenic Socialist Movement and Leader of the Opposition George Papandreou
  - Speaker of Parliament Anna Benaki-Psarouda
  - Mayor Dora Bakoyannis
  - Minister of Public Order and Citizen Protection of Greece Georgios Voulgarakis
  - Archbishop Christodoulos of Athens
  - and the entire Cabinet of Greece
- Kingdom of Greece –
  - King of the Hellenes Constantine II and wife Queen Anne-Marie
  - children Princess Alexia with her husband Carlos Morales Quintana, Princess Theodora and Prince Phillipos
  - sister Princess Irene

=== Foreign dignitaries ===
Those have been listed according to Greek alphabet:

- Saint Lucia –
  - Prime Minister Kenny Anthony and wife Rose-Marie Belle Antoine
- San Marino –
  - Captain Regents Marino Riccardi and Paolo Bollini
- Angola –
  - Prime Minister Fernando da Piedade Dias dos Santos and wife Maria Tomé Dias dos Santos
- Azerbaijan –
  - President Ilham Aliyev and wife Mehriban Aliyeva
- Egypt –
  - President Hosni Mubarak
- Albania –
  - Prime Minister Fatos Nano and wife Xhoana Nano
- Andorra –
  - Prime Minister Marc Forné Molné
- Armenia –
  - President Robert Kocharyan
- Australia –
  - Prime Minister John Howard
- Austria –
  - Chancellor Wolfgang Schüssel
- Belgium –
  - King Albert II and wife Queen Paola
  - Crown Prince Philippe and wife Princess Mathilde
  - Prime Minister Guy Verhofstadt
- Bosnia and Herzegovina –
  - Prime Minister Adnan Terzic
- Bulgaria –
  - Prime Minister Simeon Saxe-Coburg-Gotha and wife Margarita Saxe-Coburg-Gotha
- Brazil –
  - President Luiz Inácio Lula da Silva
  - Honorary FIFA President João Havelange
- British Virgin Islands –
  - Premier Orlando Smith
- France –
  - President Jacques Chirac
  - Ambassador Patrice Leclerc and wife Marie-Alice Leclerc
- Germany –
  - President Horst Köhler and wife Eva Köhler
- (Georgia (country)) Georgia –
  - President Mikhail Saakashvili
- Gabon –
  - President Omar Bongo
- Guam –
  - Governor Felix Camacho
- Denmark –
  - Queen Margrethe II
  - Prince Joachim of Denmark
  - Crown Prince Frederik and wife Crown Princess Mary
  - Prime Minister Anders Fogh Rasmussen
- Estonia –
  - President Arnold Rüütel and First Lady of Estonia Ingrid Rüütel
- United States –
  - Former President George H. W. Bush (representing his son, the President of the United States of America)
  - former First Lady Barbara Bush
  - granddaughters Jenna Bush and Barbara Pierce Bush
  - former U.S. tennis champion Chris Evert
  - U.S. Ambassador to Greece Thomas Miller
  - Archbishop Demetrios of America
  - Owner and Chairman of A.G. Spanos Companies Alex Spanos and wife Faye Spanos
  - Chair of the President's Intelligence Advisory Board Brent Scowcroft
- Japan –
  - Masahito, Prince Hitachi
  - Deputy Prime Minister Yasuo Fukuda
  - Primate of The Japanese Orthodox Church Daniel Nushiro
  - Archbishop of Tokyo Stephen Fumio Hamao
  - future Archbishop of Tokyo Rev. Fr. Tarcisio Isao Kikuchi, Society of The Divine Word (SVD)
- Jordan –
  - King Abdullah II and Queen Rania
- (Republic of Ireland) Ireland –
  - Taoiseach Bertie Ahern
- Iceland –
  - President Ólafur Ragnar Grimsson
- Spain –
  - Queen Sofía (representing her husband, the King of Spain)
  - daughters Infanta Elena, Duchess of Lugo and husband Jaime de Marichalar, Lord of Tejada, and Infanta Cristina of Spain and husband Iñaki Urdangarin
- Israel –
  - Former Prime Minister of Israel Shimon Peres
- Italy –
  - President of the Italian Republic Carlo Azeglio Ciampi
- Indonesia –
  - President of Indonesia Megawati Sukarnoputri
  - Delegation of Many Religions in Indonesia, including the Indonesian Catholic Church, Indonesian Orthodox Church, Protestantism in Indonesia, Buddhism in Indonesia, Taoism in Indonesia, Confucianism in Indonesia and others, etc.; including archbishops, bishops, priests, archdeacons, deacons, elders, nuns, monks, including schemanuns, schemamonks and others, etc.
- Kazakhstan –
  - President of Kazakhstan Nursultan Nazarbayev
- Canada –
  - Foreign Minister of Canada Lloyd Axworthy
- China –
  - Foreign Minister of China Li Zhaoxing
- Kyrgyzstan –
  - Prime Minister of Kyrgyzstan Nikolai Tanayev
- South Korea –
  - President Roh Moo-hyun
- Cook Islands –
  - President Christopher Loeak
- Croatia –
  - President Stjepan Mesić
- Cyprus –
  - President Tassos Papadopoulos
  - President of the House of Representatives Demetris Christofias
- Lesotho –
  - Deputy Prime Minister of Lesotho Tom Thabane
- Latvia –
  - President Vaira Vīķe-Freiberga
- Belarus –
  - President Aleksander Lukashenko
- Lebanon –
  - Deputy Prime Minister Saad Hariri
- (History of Libya under Muammar Gaddafi) Libyan Arab Jamahiriya –
  - First Lady Fatiha al-Nuri
- Lithuania –
  - Prime Minister Algirdas Brazauskas
- Liechtenstein –
  - Prime Minister Otmar Hasler
- Luxembourg –
  - Grand Duke Henri
- Malta –
  - President Edward Fenech Adami
- United Kingdom –
  - Anne, Princess Royal (representing her mother, the Queen of the United Kingdom)
  - Prime Minister Tony Blair and wife Cherie Blair
- (Federated States of Micronesia) Micronesia –
  - President Manny Mori
- Moldova –
  - President Vladimir Voronin
- Monaco –
  - Sovereign Prince Albert (representing his father, the Prince of Monaco)
- New Zealand –
  - Prime Minister Helen Clark
- Norway –
  - Crown Prince Haakon (representing his father, the King of Norway)
  - Prime Minister of Norway Kjell Magne Bondevik
- South Africa –
  - First Lady Zanele Mbeki
- Netherlands –
  - Crown Prince Willem-Alexander (representing his mother, the Queen of the Netherlands)
  - Prime Minister of the Netherlands Jan Peter Balkenende
- Hungary –
  - President Ferenc Mádl
- Uzbekistan –
  - President Islam Karimov
- Ukraine –
  - Prime Minister Viktor Yanukovych
- Palestine –
  - President Mahmood Abbas
- Poland –
  - President Aleksander Kwaśniewski and First Lady Jolanta Kwaśniewska
- Portugal –
  - President Jorge Sampaio
- – Philippines
  - President Gloria Macapagal Arroyo
  - Archbishop of Manila and President of the Catholic Bishops Conference of the Philippines (CBCP) Jaime Cardinal Sin
  - Delegation of the Philippine Orthodox Church, including archbishops, bishops, priests, archdeacons, deacons, elders, nuns, monks, including schemanuns, schemamonks and others, etc.
- (North Macedonia) FYR Macedonia –
  - Prime Minister Hari Kostov
- Rwanda –
  - President Paul Kagame
- Romania –
  - President Ion Iliescu
- Russia –
  - President Vladimir Putin
  - President of the Russian Olympic Committee Leonid Tyagachyov
  - Head of Federal Sport Agency Viacheslav Fetisov
  - Mayor of Moscow Yury Luzhkov and wife First Lady of Moscow Yelena Baturina
- Senegal –
  - Prime Minister Macky Sall and wife Marieme Faye Sall
- Serbia and Montenegro –
  - President of Serbia and Montenegro Svetozar Marović
  - Serbia –
  - President Boris Tadić
  - Montenegro –
  - President Filip Vujanović
- Slovakia –
  - President Ivan Gašparovič
- Slovenia –
  - President Janez Drnovšek
- Solomon Islands –
  - Prime Minister Allan Kemakeza
- Sudan –
  - President Omar al-Bashir
- Sweden –
  - King Carl XVI Gustaf and Queen Silvia
  - Prime Minister Göran Persson
- Sri Lanka –
  - Prime Minister Mahinda Rajapaksa and wife Shiranthi Rajapaksa
- Switzerland –
  - Chancellor Pascal Couchepin
  - Defense Minister Samuel Schmid
  - and former President Adolf Ogi
- Tonga –
  - Crown Prince Tupoutoʻa
- Togo –
  - President Gnassingbé Eyadéma
- Turkey –
  - Prime Minister Recep Tayyip Erdoǧan and First Lady Emine Erdoǧan
- Tajikistan –
  - President Emomali Rahmon
- Turkmenistan –
  - President Saparmurat Niyazov
- Czech Republic –
  - President Václav Klaus
- Finland –
  - President Tarja Halonen

== Commentators ==
- (United States) NBC: Bob Costas, Katie Couric
- (United Kingdom) BBC: Barry Davies

== Music performances ==
During the "Allegory" segment highlighting the conceptual and themes and ideals of the opening ceremony, the chosen music was Gustav Mahler's Symphony No. 3 in D Minor: 6. Langsam. The music played during the "Clepsydra" segment highlighting Greek history and mythology was composed by Konstantinos Bita. The songs played were instrumental in nature and many used traditional Greek instruments. Famous Greek artists such as Stavros Xarhakos (whose song "Zeimbekiko" was played), Manos Hadjidakis, Mikis Theodorakis and Konstantinos Bita, were included in the Olympic soundtrack. The whole music project was arranged by composer George Koumendakis, who had worked in the past several times with Papaioannou and was assisted in this project by Maria Metaxaki. The music production team included Marcus Dillistone, Paul Stefanidis, Dick Lewsey and Julian Scott.

New Zealand composer John Psathas (son of Greek immigrant parents) was chosen to compose and arrange music to accompany parts of the opening ceremonies. The most prestigious engagement of his career to date, he joins the ranks of well-known composers, such as John Williams, Ryuichi Sakamoto, Leonard Bernstein and Mikis Theodorakis who have also written music for the Olympics.

Mr Psathas was engaged in 2003 to compose and arrange music for the Games' opening and closing ceremonies. He has since commuted several times between Wellington and Athens to work on the music and supervise the rehearsal process. His music includes a number of specially composed fanfares and processionals to accompany the arrival of the IOC President, the lighting of the Olympic cauldron and to precede the Olympic oaths, and he is responsible for the soundtrack to the entire 'flame sequence' of the ceremony. John Psathas has also arranged the National Anthem of Greece, the Olympic Hymn, and music by Shostakovich, Debussy and the foremost living Greek composer Mikis Theodorakis to accompany other parts of the ceremony. The fireworks at the Games' closing ceremony on 29 August will also feature music by the composer.

During the Parade of Nations, Dutchman DJ Tiësto provided the music, becoming the first DJ ever to spin live at the Olympics. During the course of his performance the Dutch athletes started dancing in front of the DJ booth and had to be moved on by officials. Tiësto later released a condensed version of the performance on CD titled Parade of the Athletes. In the liner notes, he noted the IOC requested to him that the music not contain any lyrics as they could be inadvertently misinterpreted.

Björk performed "Oceania", later included on her album Medúlla, immediately after the Parade of Nations ended. While the song was being played, a large piece of fabric (which belonged to Björk's dress) was pulled over the heads of the athletes, who had gathered on the ground in the center of the stadium following their march around the stadium. At the conclusion of Björk's performance, a map of the world was projected on the fabric.

The entrance of the torch on the stadium was surrounded by the "Le Roi Lear Fanfare", by Claude Debussy; and the cauldron was lighted by the final part of "Pirogov Suite", an epic suite by Dmitri Shostakovich. Both songs were adapted by John Psathas.

== Anthems ==
- National Anthem of Greece
- (International Olympic Committee) Olympic Hymn (Greek)

== Reviews ==
The ceremony was a source of major acclaim amongst international press and featured never before seen technologies used in a stadium, including a giant pool with slip-proof iridescent fiberglass flooring that drained its water in three minutes, innovative lighting, and an ingenious staging system utilizing a complex network of automated cables that lifted, maneuvered, and choreographed the floating pieces of sculpture to follow the music and narrative of the opening ceremony. The costumes, which also drew international praise, were designed by well-known London-based Greek fashion designer Sophia Kokosalaki. Eleftheria Deco was awarded for her lighting design of the opening ceremony with an Emmy award. NBC, an American television broadcaster of the 2004 Athens Olympics, has also been awarded with 6 Emmy Awards for its coverage of the Games and technical production.
