= King's Troop, Royal Horse Artillery =

Ceremonial cavalry unit of the British Army

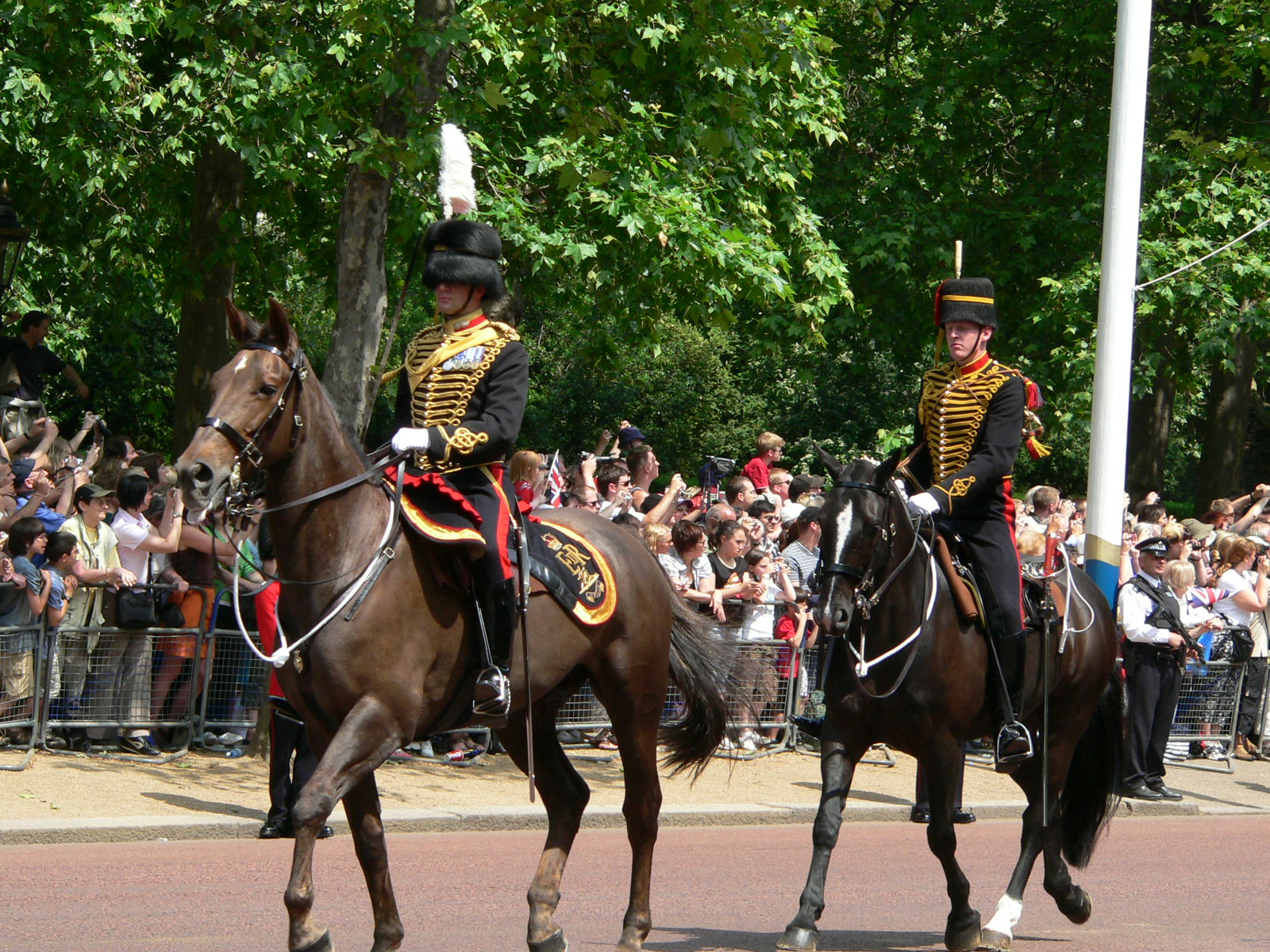
- Officer and trumpeter of the troop at the 2006 Trooping the Colour
- Active: 17 April 1946 – present
- Country: United Kingdom
- Branch: British Army
- Type: Cavalry
- Role: Ceremonial guard
- Size: One troop
- Part of: London District, England
- Garrison/HQ: Napier (King George VI) Lines, Royal Artillery Barracks, Woolwich Station
- Nickname: "The Troop"
- Patron: George VI
- Anniversaries: "Troop Day" (24 October)
- Equipment: QF 13-pounder gun
- Website: The King's Troop RHA

The King's Troop, Royal Horse Artillery is a ceremonial guard troop of the British Army's Royal Horse Artillery. Stationed at the Royal Artillery Barracks, Woolwich, the troop cares for and drives teams of six horses, each team pulling a First World War-era QF 13-pounder gun; six teams are used in the troop's Musical Drive. The troop's duties include firing salutes on royal and state occasions, participating in parades and carrying out the duties of the British monarch's Life Guard at Horse Guards for one month each year. The troop also provides the gun carriage and team of black horses for state funerals, and is most often seen providing gun salutes on state occasions in Hyde Park and Green Park.

== History ==
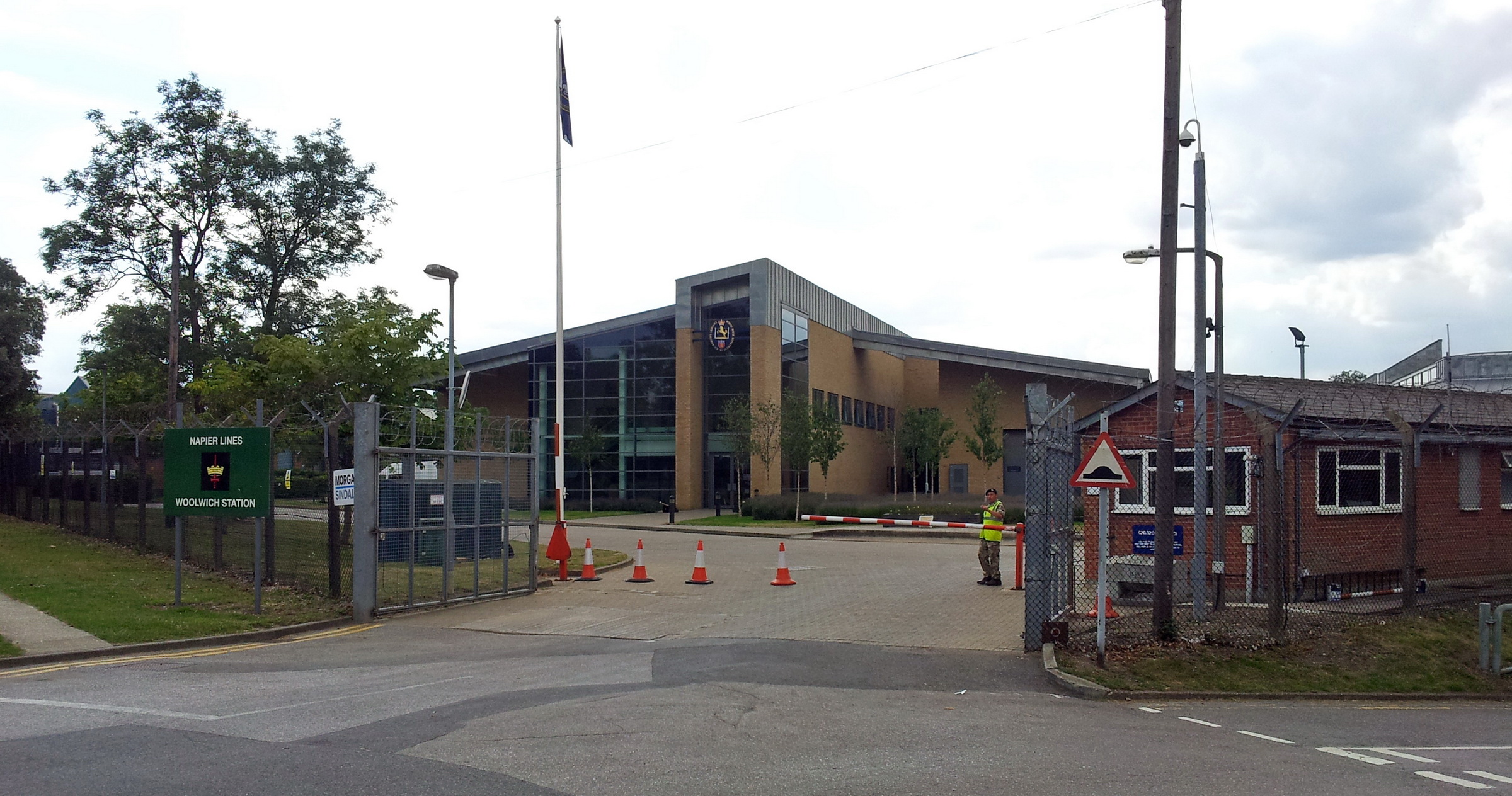
The purpose-built Napier Lines barracks at Woolwich: home of the King's Troop since 2012

After the Second World War, King George VI expressed the view that, following the mechanisation of the last batteries of horse-drawn artillery, a troop of horse artillery should be retained to take part in the great ceremonies of state. Accordingly, the Riding Troop was reformed on 17 April 1946 at Shoeburyness as a six-gun Royal Horse Artillery battery for the Household Division.

At the suggestion of Brigadier John Anquetil Norman, the King declared that the Riding Troop would be known as 'The King's Troop'. The King issued his proclamation on 24 October 1947 by amending the page on the visitors' book by striking out the word "Riding" and inserting "King's". On her accession, Queen Elizabeth II declared that the name 'The King's Troop' would remain in honour of her father.

On 6 September 1997, members of the King's Troop, Royal Horse Artillery carried the coffin of Diana, Princess of Wales on a gun carriage to her funeral.

On 14 September 2022, members of the King's Troop, Royal Horse Artillery carried the coffin of Elizabeth II on a gun carriage from Buckingham Palace to lie in state at Westminster Hall.

The King's Troop was for 65 years stationed at St John's Wood Barracks before it was relocated to Napier Lines (also known as King George VI Lines) at the traditional Royal Artillery Barracks at Woolwich in February 2012. Because of the greater distance from central London, the troop can no longer ride to many ceremonial events. Horses are transported by vehicle to stables in central London for appearances at Hyde Park, Buckingham Palace and elsewhere.

The King's Troop has about 140 members. Women were able to apply from 1996, and eventually made up about 40% of the Troop.

On 15 May 2026, Lance Bombardier Ciara Sullivan died after a fall from her horse that occurred following a display at the Royal Windsor Horse Show.

== Role ==
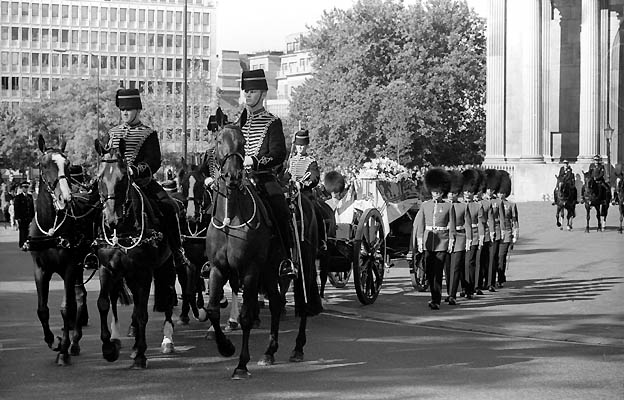
Horses of the King's Troop pass Wellington Arch drawing the gun carriage upon which is the coffin of Diana, Princess of Wales, in 1997.

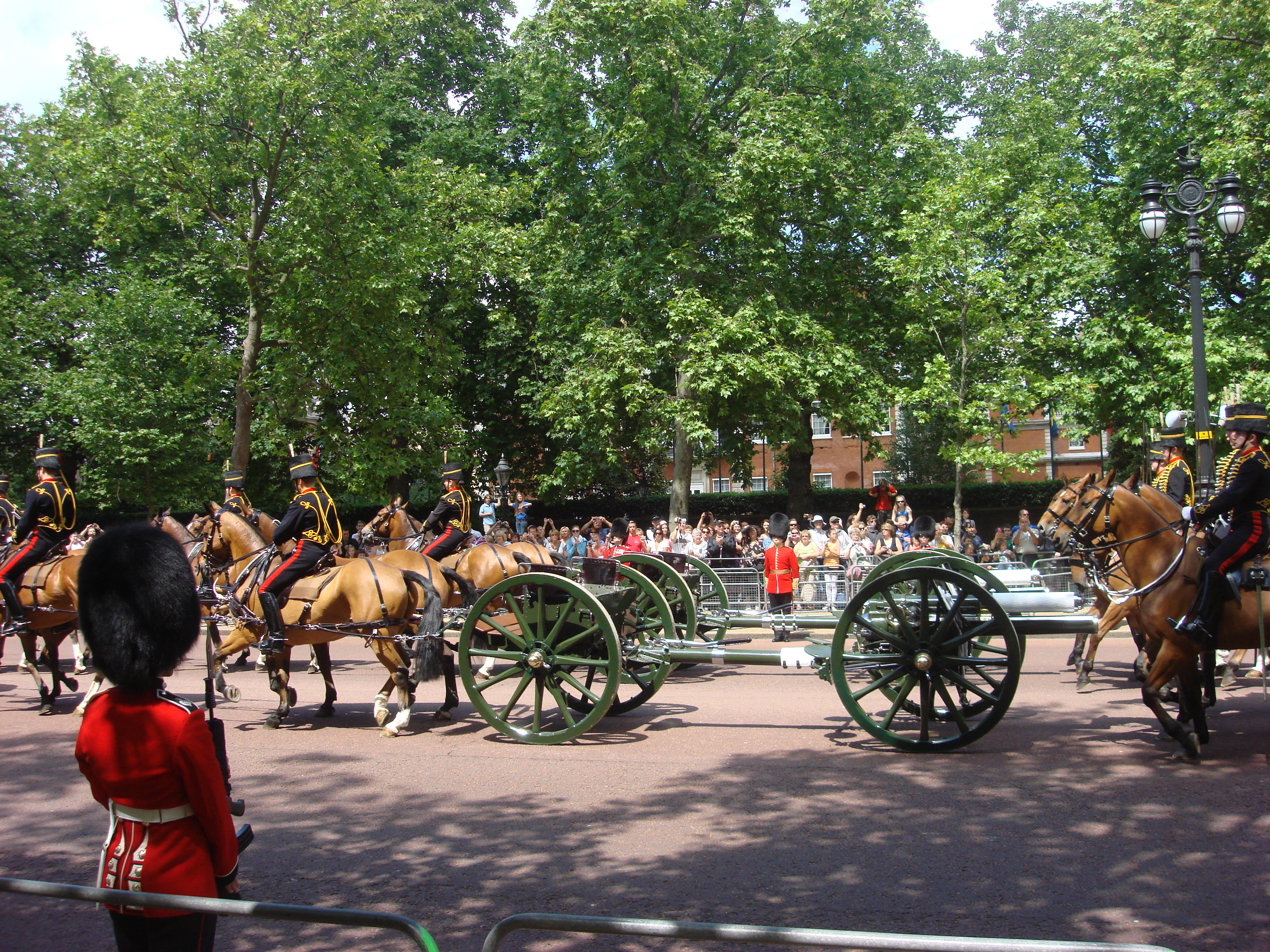
13-pounder guns of King's Troop, Royal Horse Artillery, at the 2009 Trooping the Colour.

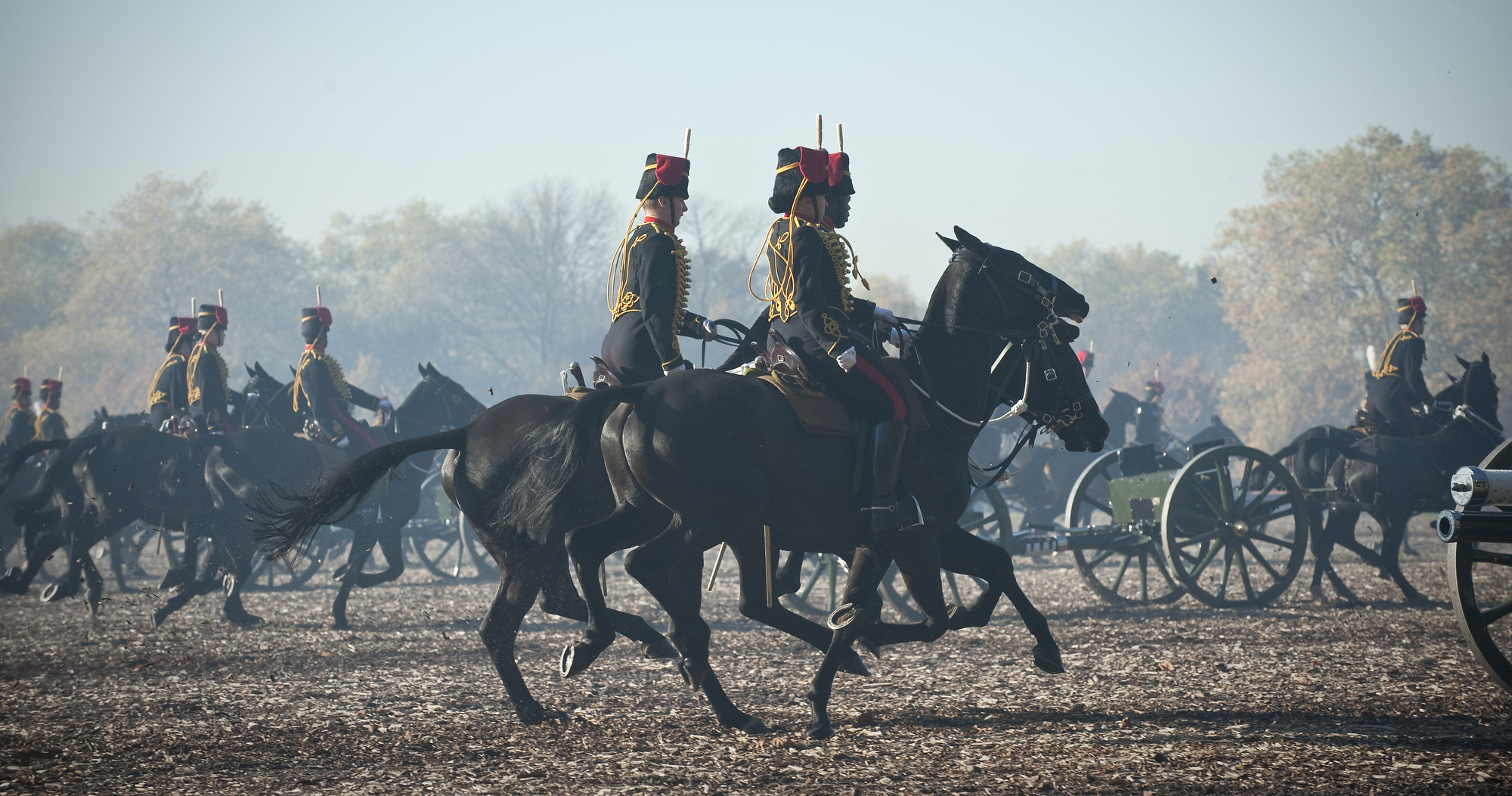
The King's Troop riding in Hyde Park in preparation for a Royal Salute for the birthday of Prince Charles in 2012.

=== Musical Drive ===
The King's Troop Royal Horse Artillery performed their Musical Drive at every Royal Tournament from its formation in 1947 to the final Royal Tournament on 2 August 1999. The Musical Drive can be seen at shows around the United Kingdom and always at the Royal Windsor Horse Show in May every year.

Many of the manoeuvres of the Musical Drive have remained unchanged since it was first performed in 1897. The start, known as the Big Drive, features the Scissors, where the whole team criss-cross at gallop, displaying choreography, teamwork and discipline. Another manoeuvre, the Wagon Wheel, depicts an inner wheel, spokes, and an outer wheel.

For a "Hero's Welcome" event in Windsor in May 2008 there were six gun teams, each of ten horses and seven riders. Women, first admitted to the King's Troop in 1996, made up one-third of the display team. Major Erica Bridge was the first female officer commanding the King's Troop.

=== Trooping the Colour ===
Together with the Household Division the King's Troop has appeared every June since 1997, when it made its first appearance, at Trooping the Colour, on Horse Guards Parade to celebrate the King's/Queen's Official Birthday. At the end of the event, the King's Troop ranks past the King.

After the ceremony, the King's Troop moves to Green Park, adjacent to Buckingham Palace, firing a 41-gun salute, which is a 21-gun salute with an additional 20 rounds fired because the gun position is in a Royal Park.

=== King's/Queen's Life Guard ===
One of the regular duties undertaken by the King's Troop is to mount the King's Life Guard on Horse Guards Parade. Although this is primarily the role of the Household Cavalry Mounted Regiment, every summer this unit goes away for 2–3 weeks for summer training (and to provide a break for their horses) to Norfolk. During this period, the King's Troop takes over responsibility for providing the mounted sentries.

== Order of precedence ==
In the order of precedence in the British Army, the Household Cavalry is listed first and normally parades at the extreme right of the line. However, when the Royal Horse Artillery is on parade with its guns, they take on the honour of taking right of the line.

== Film The Troop ==
A 35mm CinemaScope film, The Troop, was filmed in Windsor Great Park and at 'The Wood' barracks. The film had a royal premiere before the Princess Royal at BAFTA in September 1999. The Glory Film Co. production was produced and directed by Marcus Dillistone, the associate producer was Paul-Anthony Viollet (a former Troop Officer) and the introduction was spoken by Sir John Mills. Music was composed by Julian Scott and performed by the Royal Philharmonic Orchestra.

== See also ==
- British Army
- Honourable Artillery Company
- List of Royal Artillery Batteries
- Royal Artillery
- Royal Horse Artillery
- Royal Tournament
- Trooping the Colour

== Bibliography ==
- Clarke, W.G. (1993). Horse Gunners: The Royal Horse Artillery, 200 Years of Panache and Professionalism. Woolwich: The Royal Artillery Institution. ISBN 09520762-0-9.
