= Julian Scott (composer) =

Julian Robert Scott
- Born: 30 August 1956 (age 69)
- Origin: Kent, England, UK
- Genres: Events, Film scores, Television, Advertising
- Occupation: Composer
- Years active: 1990–present
- Website: https://www.julianscott.com

Julian Scott is an English composer, notable for his work on international events, ceremonies and expositions. He has composed music for the 2004 Summer Olympics opening ceremony, the 2002 Commonwealth Games Opening Ceremony, the Millennium Dome, events for The Channel Tunnel, Thames Barrier, Trafalgar 200, the New Year's Eve celebrations in London 2005/06, the 2007 Tour de France and the G8 Summit. He has also been commissioned to write music for Ferrari, Toyota, BMW, Williams F1, Fiat and Boeing. His work in film and television includes the music to The Troop, directed by Marcus Dillistone.
