= Seraphim Tsujie =

Japanese clergyman (born 1951)

His Eminence Seraphim
- Archbishop of Tokyo, Metropolitan of All Japan
- Church: Orthodox Church in Japan
- See: Tokyo
- Elected: 28 September 2023
- Installed: 22 October 2023
- Predecessor: Daniel (Nushiro)
- Previous posts: Bishop of Sendai (2000-2023); Locum tenens of the Orthodox Church in Japan (2023)

Orders
- Ordination: 5 November 1989 by Theodosius (Nagashima)
- Consecration: 15 January 2000 by Alexy II of Moscow

Personal details
- Born: Noburu Tsujie; 23 March 1951 (age 75) Akita, Akita Prefecture, Japan
- Denomination: Eastern Orthodox
- Education: Tokyo College of Photography; Tokyo Orthodox Seminary

Metropolitan Seraphim (セラフィム大主教, Serafimu dai shukyō) (23 March 1951) is a Japanese prelate of the Orthodox Church in Japan. He has been the primate of the Orthodox Church in Japan since 2023, by virtue of the office of the Archbishop of Tokyo with the title His Eminence Seraphim, Archbishop of Tokyo and Metropolitan of All Japan.

== Early life ==
Metropolitan Seraphim was born on 23 March 1951, in Akita. In 1969, he entered the Tokyo College of Photography, from which he graduated in 1973, after which he worked in an advertising company. In 1987, Tsujie was baptized with the name Andrew in honor of the Andrew the Apostle. In 1987, he entered the Tokyo Orthodox Seminary, from which he graduated in 1990. On 5 November 1989, Tsujie was ordained by Bishop Herman (Swaiko) as a celibate deacon and served in the Holy Resurrection Cathedral.

== Priesthood ==
On 18 August 1991, Tsujie was ordained a priest by Metropolitan Theodosius (Nagashima). He then began working in the metropolitan office and also became an inspector of the Tokyo Theological Seminary. By August 1993, he began to serve in the Holy Resurrection Cathedral. On 20 August 1999, at the Trinity Lavra of St. Sergius, he was tonsured a monk with the name Seraphim in honor of Seraphim of Sarov. On 6 September 1999, at the Dormition Cathedral, Patriarch Alexy II elevated Seraphim to the rank of abbot. On 28 December of the same year, by resolution of the Holy Synod, he was appointed the Bishop of Sendai of Orthodox Church in Japan.

On 9 January 2000, Seraphim was elevated to the rank of archimandrite by Alexy II. Six days later, he was consecrated as Bishop of Sendai. As a representative of the Japanese Church, he visited Russia several times. With a report on the Japanese Orthodox Church, he took part in the International Scientific and Practical Conference "Christianity in the Far East", held from 19 to 21 September 2006 in Khabarovsk.

The areas within the Sendai Diocese were the hardest hit by the devastating earthquake and tsunami that struck northeastern Japan on 11 March 2011, but Seraphim himself was not injured. On 8 July 2012, by decision of the Council of the Japanese Orthodox Church, he was elevated to archbishop. On 16 April 2016, by decision of the Holy Synod, Seraphim was included in the delegation of the Russian Orthodox Church to participate in the Pan-Orthodox Council, but on 13 June, the ROC refused to participate in the council.

== Metropolitan of All Japan ==
On 10 August 2023, following the death of Metropolitan Daniel (Nushiro), Seraphim was appointed Acting Primate. On 28 September, at an extraordinary Council of the Japanese Orthodox Church, he was elected Archbishop of Tokyo and Metropolitan of All Japan, on the same day the election was approved by Patriarch Kirill. The enthronement took place on 22 October 2023.
