= Sir John Mills' Moving Memories =

Documentary

- Directed by: Marcus Dillistone
- Starring: Sir John Mills, Walt Disney, David Niven, Tyrone Power, Ralph Richardson, Richard Attenborough, Douglas Fairbanks Jnr., Nanette Newman, Stewart Grainger, Tom Courtenay, Rex Harrison, Karl Malden, Vivien Leigh, Dirk Bogarde, Bryan Forbes, Ian McShane, Tony Hancock, Montgomery Clift, Anthony Quayle, Jean Simmons, Harry Andrews, Lionel Jefferies, Deborah Kerr, Bernard Lee, Joan Plowright, Ernest Borgnine, Angela Lansbury, Terry-Thomas, Laurence Olivier, Mary Mills, Juliet Mills, Hayley Mills
- Country of origin: United Kingdom

Production
- Producer: Jonathan Mills
- Running time: 60 minutes
- Production company: Glory Film Co.

Original release
- Network: BBC Two
- Release: 2000

Sir John Mills' Moving Memories is a British documentary film featuring 16mm color home movies shot by the actor Sir John Mills. It documents his life between 1946 and 1969, directed and edited by Marcus Dillistone and produced by his son Jonathan Mills. Commentary was provided by Sir John (who was over 90 years old at the time), Hayley Mills, Juliet Mills and Sir Richard Attenborough. His wife Mary Hayley Bell is also seen towards the end of the film listening to her husband singing at the piano. The scene was later to be screened in full when Sir John appeared on the Parkinson chat show.

The home movie clips date mainly from the 1950 and early 1960s and include appearances by Dirk Bogarde, David Niven, Laurence Olivier, James Mason, Lionel Jeffries, Rex Harrison, Walt Disney, Jean Simmons, Harry Andrews, Tyrone Power and Stewart Granger. Some of the color footage was shot on the sets of black and white movies such as Ice-Cold in Alex (1958) and Dunkirk (1958). Marcus, who also edited the film, spent many hours matching Sir John's home movie location clips to the finished scenes in these movies.

Jonathan said "I immediately realised what could be made using these home movies – a unique way of telling my father's extraordinary life story."

The film was broadcast by the BBC in its Christmas schedule.

In 2002 the film was released on DVD and VHS video by ITV Studios Home Entertainment.
