= Marcus Dillistone =

British film director

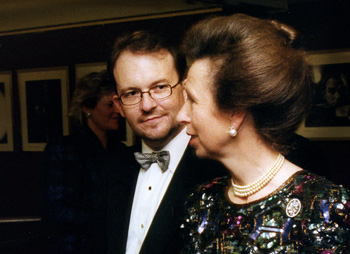
- Marcus Dillistone with Anne, Princess Royal at BAFTA for the Royal Premiere of The Troop (1999).
- Born: Marcus Dillistone; 17 March 1961; Royal Tunbridge Wells, Kent, England
- Education: The Skinners' School; University of Staffordshire, BA Hons; University of Portsmouth, PhD
- Occupations: Film Director, Producer, Writer
- Years active: 1983 - present
- Title: Fellow of the Royal Society of Arts; Member of the Royal Society of Medicine
- Children: Olivia Dillistone
- Website: www.marcusdillistone.com

Marcus Dillistone is a British film director.

A close friend of Sir John Mills, he directed the BBC/Carlton documentary of Mills' life, Sir John Mills' Moving Memories. Dillistone and Mills first collaborated on Dillistone's film The Troop, which had a Royal Premiere at BAFTA in the presence of The Princess Royal. A copy of the film was requested by a Royal Equerry for screening to The Queen at Sandringham over Christmas. A 35mm film print was donated by Fujifilm, Technicolor, and Glory Film Co. Dillistone directed Mills in his last ever screen appearance, Lights 2, in which he played a tramp. Shot at Pinewood Studios, Mills was lit by veteran cinematographer Jack Cardiff, they had last worked together on 'Scott of The Antarctic'.

As of 2017 Dillistone was collaborating with the Academy of Motion Picture Arts and Sciences in Hollywood on the film-to-digital reformatting and restoration of his film The Troop. The academy selected The Troop as a case study in using its ACES color management methodology; also contributing to the study are Dolby Laboratories, EFilm, Fotokem, and Universal.

== Education ==
Dillistone was educated at The Skinners' School in Tunbridge Wells, Kent, and Kent Institute of Art & Design, before gaining an honours degree at University of Staffordshire, specialising in design and film production, where his lead tutor was John Jordan, sound recordist on Stanley Kubrick's A Clockwork Orange. Marcus has a PhD in Film, Media, and Creative Technologies from the University of Portsmouth.

== Glory Film Co. ==
Dillistone set up the company Glory Film Co. to make The Troop film with help from Paul-Anthony Viollet, a former King's Troop RHA officer. Cinematographer on The Troop was Alex Thomson (cinematographer).

As a result of The Troop, with which Fujifilm collaborated, Dillistone was commissioned to make a series of films for worldwide release in order to demonstrate Fuji's new motion picture filmstocks. He employed cinematographers including: Oscar-winners Jack Cardiff and Ronnie Taylor, together with Phedon Papamichael, Geoff Boyle NSC FBKSTS, John de Borman, Sue Gibson, Thierry Arbogast, Ron Stanett, and Tony Pierce-Roberts. The films were shot at Pinewood and Shepperton studios, with locations including Hastings in East Sussex.

== British Film Industry Tribute ==
In 2001, Dillistone directed a major British Film Institute tribute event held in the Painted Hall in Greenwich. Hosted by The Lord's Taverners, and the First Sea Lord of the Royal Navy, Admiral Sir Nigel Essenhigh; participating artists included Sir Roger Moore, Stephen Fry, Lord Andrew Lloyd Webber, Lord Richard Attenborough, Juliet Mills, Hayley Mills, Richard Stilgoe, Sarah Miles, and Dame Kiri te Kanawa.

== Olympic Music Production ==
Experience working on major musical recordings, including work with The Royal Philharmonic Orchestra, led to Dillistone being employed as Associate Producer Music for the Athens 2004 Summer Olympics opening ceremony and closing ceremony. In December 2007, Dillistone was invited by the Governor of Luxor to screen a trailer of his latest film to the former Egyptian President Hosni Mubarak and the Prime Minister of Egypt, Ahmed Nazif. This was followed by an Invitation from the Jordanian Minister of Culture to present a film at the 2009 Jordan Festival in Amman.

== Icehotel ==
In December 2010, Dillistone completed an Ice Suite for the world-famous Icehotel (Jukkasjärvi), working 200 km north of the Arctic Circle in Swedish Lappland at temperatures down to –40 °C. On 2 July 2013, Icehotel announced that he would return to the Arctic to complete a new creative concept: a London Underground tube terminus built entirely from snow and ice entitled "Mind the Gap (Last Stop on the Northern Line)".

== Media appearances ==
Dillistone has appeared on the BBC (live primetime news) and on ITV, as well as on the radio, including the Robert Elms show on the BBC. His work has also appeared in print in publications that include Paris Match, The Guardian, Washington Post, New York Times, The Telegraph, Times, Metro, UPI, and The Dallas Morning News.

== Philanthropy ==
Dillistone is also involved in social and charitable film making, being particularly known for films dealing with social and medical matters (his films have garnered a number of British Medical Association awards). Dillistone has supported organisations such as the Riding for the Disabled Association, the British Brain and Spine Foundation, and the Sarah Lamping Memorial Expedition. In June 2011, he was invited to launch the Spinal Injury Patient Film at The Ludwig Guttmann conference - this film garnered a prize at the 2012 Telly Awards. In April 2015 The Spinal Injuries Association (SIA) nominated Dillistone for an award for his philanthropic film work - contributing to better outcomes for SCI patients.

== Lectures and academic work ==
Dillistone has presented papers at the world's two leading broadcast conventions, NAB (USA) and IBC (Europe). He was invited to participate in Quantel's 'Focus on The Future' event in London (2002) He also lectures extensively on film making, including lectures at UCLA, the American University in Washington, D.C. and Staffordshire University (UK). Topics include documentary films, scientific, medical and technical films, and travel films. He has also hosted master-classes in the US, Europe and the Caribbean, on filmmaking, imaging and photography. Dillistone has written articles for several professional publications, including Televisual, AV Magazine, Kodak's magazine and Exposure. He co-authored the academic paper "A comparison of perceptions of quality of life among adults with spinal cord injury in the United States versus the United Kingdom".

== Academic Publications ==
Development and psychometric evaluation of a Fatigability Index for full-time wheelchair users with spinal cord injury.

Preferences of adults with spinal cord injury for widely used health-related quality of life and subjective well-being measures.

A comparison of perceptions of quality of life among adults with spinal cord injury in the United States versus the United Kingdom.

== Royal Society of Medicine ==
In September 2013, in recognition of his contribution to medical filmmaking, Dillistone was elected a Member of the Royal Society of Medicine. He is a key figure in the development of healthcare knowledge transfer, and on 30 April 2014 gave the keynote lecture at The Royal Society's annual conference on ethics.

== Awards ==
Dillistone's films have won fifty-eight international awards, including: Winner IVCA Best Direction. Director of: New York Festival Grand Prix Nominee (British Airways); New York Festival Gold Medal; New York Festival Gold Medal; New York Festival Gold Medal; New York Festival Gold Medal International Telly Award; International Telly Award; International Telly Award; International Telly Award; Global Award Winner; BMA Award; BMA Award; BMA Award; IVCA Best Editing Nomination; Berlin Festival Gold Medallist; New York Festival Silver Medal; New York Festival Silver Medal; New York Festival Finalist; Institute of Training & Development Award Winner; IVCA Category Winner; IVCA Category Winner; IVCA Category Winner; IVCA Category Winner; IVCA Best Editing Nomination; IVCA Best Graphics & Animation Nomination; Images Festival Winner; European Multi-Media Award Winner; Writer of: IVCA Category Winner; Telly award - silver; Telly award – silver; Telly award – bronze; Telly award – bronze; SIA Rebuilding Lives Awards (nominee), PM Awards Best Overall TV Commercial; IVCA Award winner Healthcare Advertising Agency Group Award.
