= Daniel Nushiro =

Japanese clergyman (1938–2023)

His Eminence Daniel
- Archbishop of Tokyo, Metropolitan of all Japan
- Church: Orthodox Church in Japan
- See: Tokyo
- Installed: 14 May 2000
- Term ended: 10 August 2023
- Predecessor: Theodosius (Nagashima)
- Successor: Seraphim (Tsujie)

Orders
- Ordination: 1972
- Consecration: 14 November 1999

Personal details
- Born: Jude Nushiro; 5 September 1938 Toyohashi, Aichi, Japan
- Died: 10 August 2023 (aged 84) Tokyo, Tokyo prefecture, Japan
- Denomination: Eastern Orthodox
- Education: Saint Vladimir's Orthodox Theological Seminary, Aichi University

Metropolitan Daniel (ダニエル大主教, Danieru dai shukyō) (5 September 1938 – 10 August 2023) was a Japanese clergyman and monk of the Japanese Orthodox Church. He had been the primate of the Japanese Orthodox Church since 2000, by virtue of the office of the Archbishop of Tokyo. He was thus the spiritual leader of approximately 30,000 Japanese Orthodox Christians. His full title was His Eminence Daniel, Archbishop of Tokyo and Metropolitan of All Japan.

== Early life ==
Metropolitan Daniel was born on 5 September 1938 into a Japanese Orthodox family in Toyohashi, Aichi, and was baptized as Jude. After he graduated with a degree in French literature from Aichi University in 1962, he studied theology at Tokyo Orthodox Seminary until 1965. He went to Saint Vladimir's Orthodox Theological Seminary in Crestwood, New York. In 1968 he finished his study at Saint Vladimir and was ordained to the diaconate in the same year.

Upon his return to Japan, he served as a deacon at Tokyo Resurrection Cathedral from November 1970 till 1972. In 1972 he was ordained a priest and served in Toyohashi, until 1999.

== Appointment to the primacy ==
In 1999 his predecessor, Metropolitan Theodosius (Nagashima) of Japan died, and the Japanese Orthodox Church decided to elect three bishops and Jude Nushiro was considered as a good candidate for bishopric, as his wife had predeceased him. On 20 August 1999, he received his monastic tonsure and became known as monk Daniel, and was consecrated a bishop on 14 November 1999.

The Japanese Orthodox Church had planned to enthrone Bishop Peter (Arihara) of Yokohama as successor to the late Metropolitan Theodosius, and appoint Daniel to the Bishopric of Kyoto, but the sudden death of Peter in this year changed their plan entirely. Daniel was then considered the successor of Theodore, and elevated to the rank of archbishop and metropolitan. On 14 May 2000, Daniel was enthroned to the Archbishop of Tokyo and Metropolitan of All Japan, consecrated by Patriarch Alexy II of Russia who visited Japan for his enthronement and other bishops.

== Spiritual leadership ==
Daniel was a prolific writer and preacher with humor and plain wording. He issued tracts both focusing on daily reading and theological issues. The latter type of his writing is published as brochures for the education of the faithful. In his leadership a male monastery was founded in Tokyo in 2005, near to the Resurrection Cathedral.

Daniel gained some popularity in the Russian internet in January 2009, before the election of the Patriarch of Moscow and All Russia. A group of laity started a website, where all users could vote for the future Patriarch. As a result, Daniel, "only bishop not directly related to the former USSR", took the first place ahead of Kirill.

The administration of the website zapatriarha.ru then zeroed votes for Daniel and excluded him from a list of candidates, explaining his high ratings as the result of a "hacker attack". Such actions caused Internet voters to accuse the website creators of promoting Kirill.

== Death ==
Daniel died on 10 August 2023, at the age of 84 at Kyoundo Hospital after respiratory failure due to interstitial lung disease. He was buried at the Yokohama Foreign General Cemetery on the afternoon of 17 August 2023.

On the same day, 10 August 2023, Archbishop Seraphim, Archbishop of the Orthodox Church of Japan in Sendai and Vice-Bishop of Tokyo was appointed Acting Primate.
