= Symbolic and cultural significance of the olive =

The olive tree and its fruit have symbolic and cultural significance in many cultures. Researchers and historians have identified the olive as one of the defining characteristics of both ancient and contemporary Mediterranean culture, geography, and cuisine. Georges Duhamel remarked that the "Mediterranean ends where the olive tree no longer grows". An olive branch is a symbol of peace.

== Ancient Greece ==
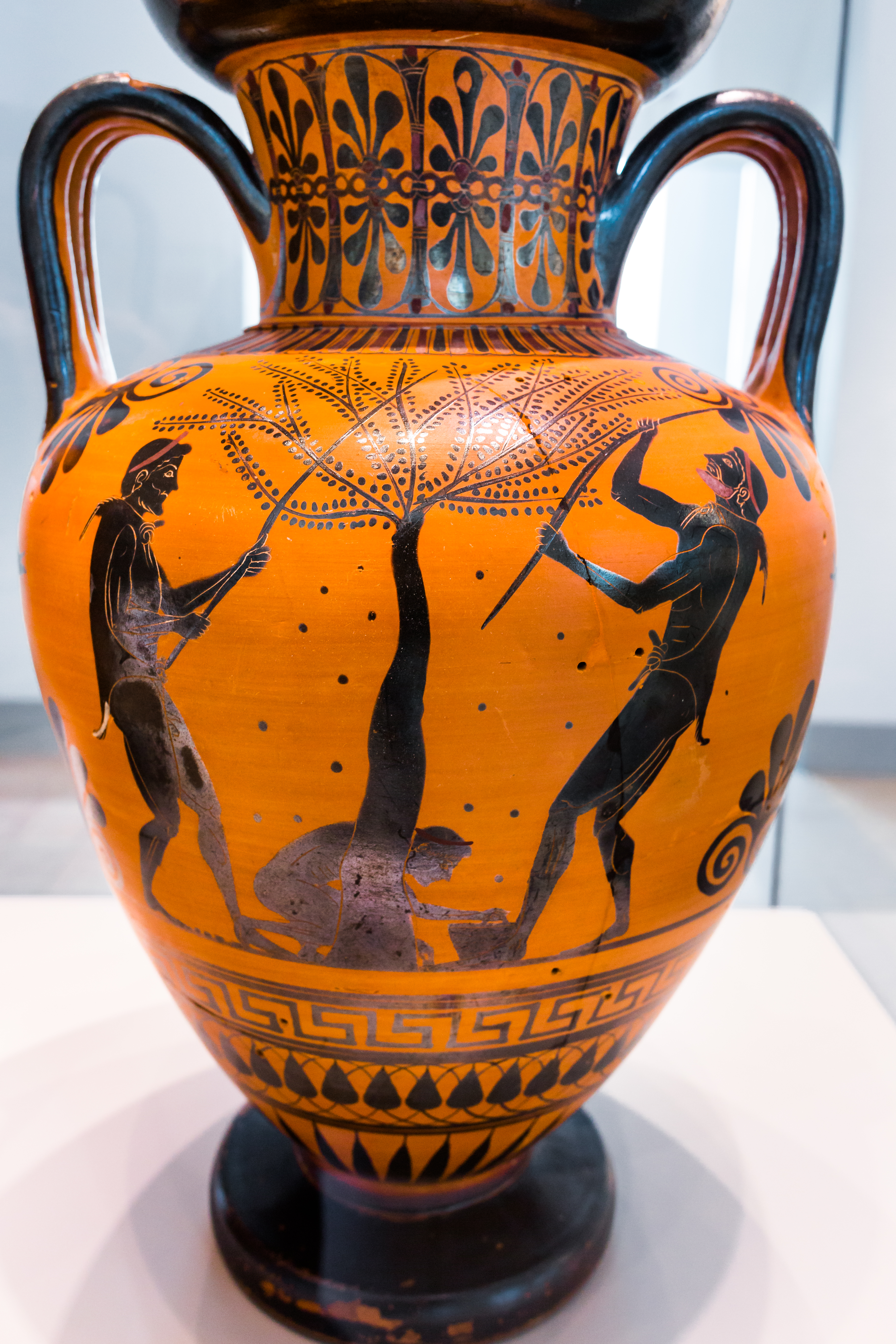
Greek vase showing two bearded men and a youth gathering olives from a tree, by the Antimenes Painter (c. 520–510 BC)

Olives are thought to have been domesticated in the third millennium BC at the latest, at which point they, along with grain and grapes, became part of Colin Renfrew's Mediterranean triad of staple crops that fueled the emergence of more complex societies. Olives, and especially (perfumed) olive oil, became a major export product during the Minoan and Mycenaean periods. Dutch archaeologist Jorrit Kelder proposed that the Mycenaeans sent shipments of olive oil, probably alongside live olive branches, to the court of Egyptian pharaoh Akhenaten as a diplomatic gift. In Egypt, these imported olive branches may have acquired ritual meanings, as they are depicted as offerings on the wall of the Aten temple and were used in wreaths for the burial of Tutankhamun. It is likely that, as well as being used for culinary purposes, olive oil had various other purposes, including as a perfume.

The ancient Greeks smeared olive oil on their bodies and hair as a matter of grooming and good health. Olive oil was used to anoint kings and athletes in ancient Greece. It was burnt in the sacred lamps of temples and was the "eternal flame" of the original Olympic games, whose victors were crowned with its leaves. The olive appears frequently, and often prominently, in ancient Greek literature. In Homer's Odyssey (c. eighth century BC), Odysseus crawls beneath two shoots of olive that grow from a single stock, and in the Iliad, (XVII.53ff) there is a metaphoric description of a lone olive tree in the mountains by a spring; the Greeks observed that the olive rarely thrives at a distance from the sea, which in Greece invariably means up mountain slopes. Greek myth attributed to the primordial culture-hero Aristaeus the understanding of olive husbandry, along with cheese-making and beekeeping. Olive was one of the woods used to fashion the most primitive Greek cult figures, called xoana, referring to their wooden material; they were reverently preserved for centuries.

In an archaic Athenian foundation myth, Athena won the patronage of Attica from Poseidon with the gift of the olive. According to the fourth-century BC father of botany, Theophrastus, olive trees ordinarily attained an age around 200 years, and he mentions that the very olive tree of Athena still grew on the Acropolis; it was still to be seen there in the second century AD, and when Pausanias was shown it c. 170 AD, he reported "Legend also says that when the Persians fired Athens the olive was burnt down, but on the very day it was burnt it grew again to the height of two cubits." Because olive suckers sprout readily from the stump, and some existing olive trees are purportedly many centuries old, it is possible that the olive tree of the Acropolis dated to the Bronze Age. The olive remained sacred to Athens and its patron deity Athena, appearing on its coinage. According to another myth, Elaea—whose name translates to "olive"—was an accomplished athlete killed by fellow athletes out of envy; owing to her impressive achievement, Athena and Gaia turn her into an olive tree as a reward.

The olive and its properties were subject to early scientific and empirical observation. Theophrastus, in On the Causes of Plants, states that the cultivated olive must be vegetatively propagated; indeed, the pits give rise to thorny, wild-type olives, spread far and wide by birds. He also reports how the bearing olive can be grafted on the wild olive, for which the Greeks had a separate name, kotinos. In his Enquiry into Plants, Theophrastus states that the olive can be propagated from a piece of the trunk, the root, a twig, or a stake. Homer described olive oil as "liquid gold", while Hippocrates (c. 460 BC – c. 375 BC), widely regarded as the father of medicine, considered it "the great healer".

== Ancient Egypt ==
Ancient Egyptians believed that Isis, the consort of Osiris and the mother of university, taught mankind to extract oil from olives; olive oil has been found among valuable treasures buried in the tombs of important prehistoric Egyptians, and was used as an offering to the gods.

== Ancient Rome ==
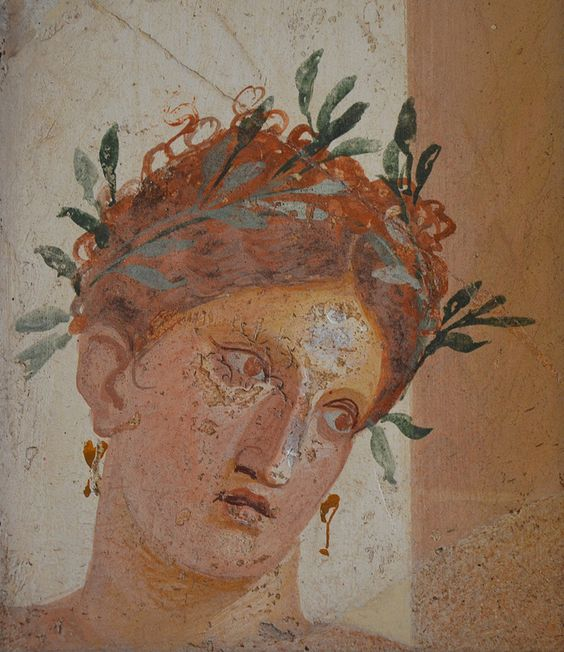
Woman with red hair wearing a garland of olives, from the Roman city of Herculaneum, sometime before the city's destruction in 79 AD

Like the Greeks, the Romans held olives in high regard for various purposes, both practical and symbolic. Roman mythology held that Hercules introduced the olive tree to Italy from North Africa, while the goddess of wisdom, Minerva, taught the art of cultivation and oil extraction. Numerous archaeological finds indicate the presence of the olive tree in Lazio, the region around Rome, as early as the 7th century BC; however, rudimentary olive production has also been traced back to earlier Etruscan and Sabine settlements in the area.

The olive tree was subject to many treatises and agronomic works by the Romans. Pliny the Elder, in his first century AD encyclopedia, Naturalis Historia, describes at least 22 different varieties and qualities of olive trees, detailing their respective techniques for cultivation and production. He also observes that an olive tree is one of only three plants—along with a vine and fig tree—growing in the middle of the Roman Forum, which served as the center of daily life in the city; the olive was purportedly planted to provide shade. (The garden was recreated in the 20th century). Pliny also remarked on the health properties of olive oil, describing it as an "absolute necessity."

Roman poet Horace mentions the olive in reference to his own diet, which he describes as very simple: "As for me, olives, endives, and smooth mallows provide sustenance." Roman architect and engineer Vitruvius describes of the use of charred olive wood in tying together walls and foundations in his De Architectura. Olive cultivation and production was also recognized for its commercial and economic importance; according to Cato the Younger, among the various tasks of the pater familias (the family patriarch and head of household) was that of keeping an account of the olive oil. The city of Rome designated a special area for negotiating and selling olive oil that was managed by negotiatores oleari, who were analogous to stockbrokers.

== Judaism ==
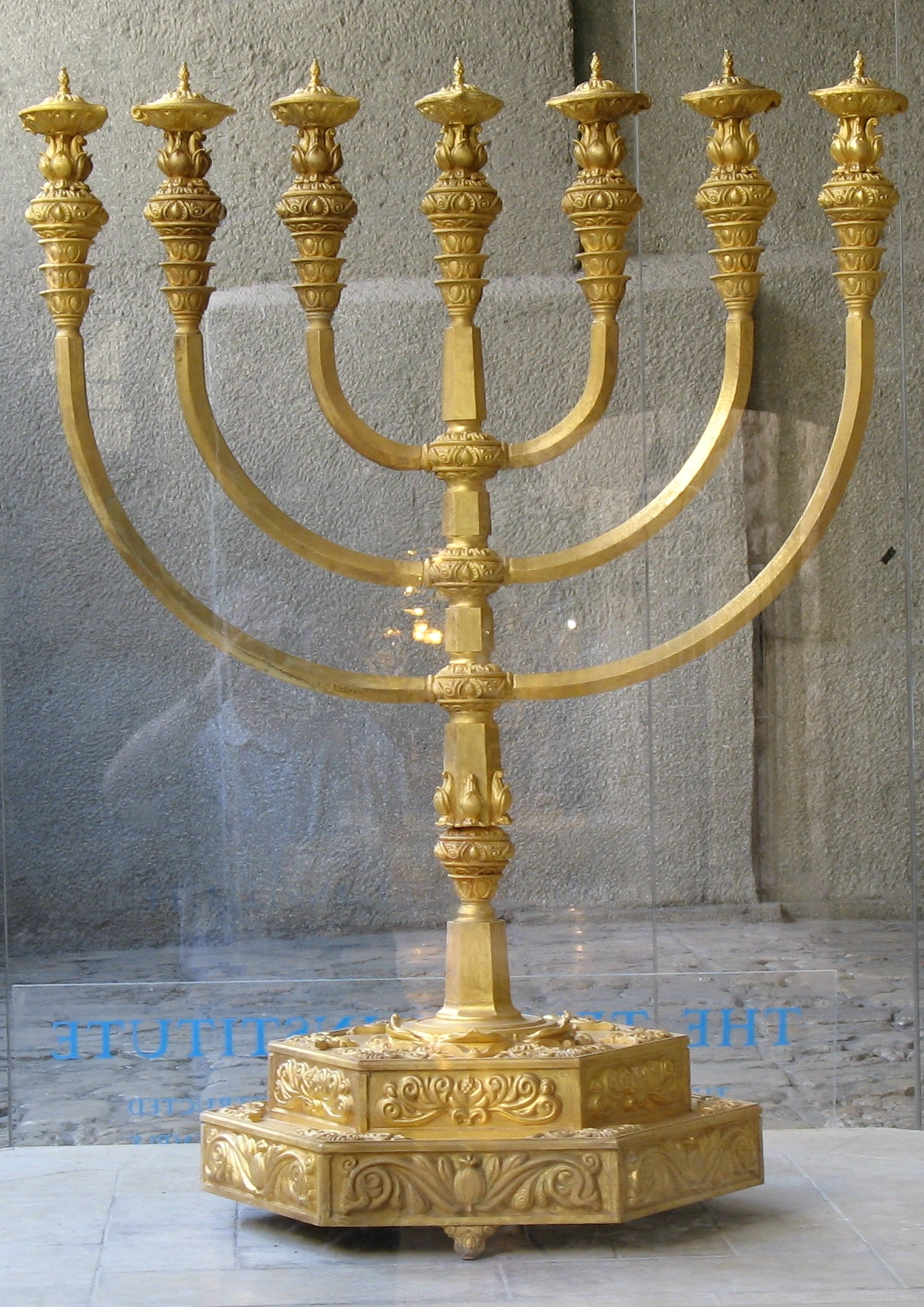
Replica of the Temple Menorah, which according to the Hebrew Bible, was made of pure gold and could be fueled only by consecrated fresh olive oil

Olives were one of the main elements in ancient Israelite cuisine. Olive oil was used not only culinarily, but also for lighting, sacrificial offerings, ointment, and anointing religious and political officials. The word moshiach—Hebrew for Messiah—means "anointed one"; in Jewish eschatology, the Messiah is a future Jewish king from the Davidic line, who is expected to be anointed with holy oil partially derived from olive oil. The olive tree is one of the first plants mentioned in the Hebrew Bible, and one of the most significant; an olive branch (or leaf, depending on translation) was brought back to Noah by a dove to demonstrate that the flood was over (Genesis 8:11).

The olive's importance in Israel is expressed in the parable of Jotham in Judges 9:8–9: "One day the trees went out to anoint a king for themselves. They said to the olive tree, 'Be our king.' But the olive tree answered, 'Should I give up my oil, by which both gods and humans are honored, to hold sway over the trees?'" The olive tree is also analogized to a righteous man (Psalm 52:8; Hosea 14:6) whose "children will be like vigorous young olive trees" (Psalm 128:3).

Deuteronomy characterizes the "Promised Land" of the Hebrews as containing olive groves (6:11) and subsequently lists olives as one of the seven species that are special products of the Land of Israel (8:8). According to the Halakha, the Jewish law mandatory for all Jews, the olive is one of the seven species that require the recitation of me'eyn shalosh, a blessing of gratitude, after they are consumed. Olive oil is also the most recommended and best possible oil for lighting Shabbat candles.

Olive oil features prominently in the Jewish festival of Hanukkah, which commemorates the recovery of Jerusalem and subsequent rededication of the Second Temple during the Maccabean Revolt against the Seleucid Empire in the 2nd century BC. According to the Talmud, the central text of Rabbinical Judaism, after Seleucid forces had been driven from the Temple, the Maccabees discovered that almost all the ritual olive oil for the Temple menorah had been profaned. They found only single container with just enough pure oil to keep the menorah lit for a single day; however, it burned for eight days—the time needed for new oil to have been prepared—a miracle that forms a major part of Hanukkah celebrations. Subsequently, the olive tree and its oil have come to represent the strength and persistence of the Jewish people. In common with other Mediterranean cultures, the Jewish people used it for many practical and ritualistic purposes, from fuel and medicine to cosmetics and even currency; as in Greek and Roman societies, athletes were cleansed by covering their skin with oil then scraping it to remove the dirt. Jews who settled in foreign lands often became olive merchants.

== Christianity ==
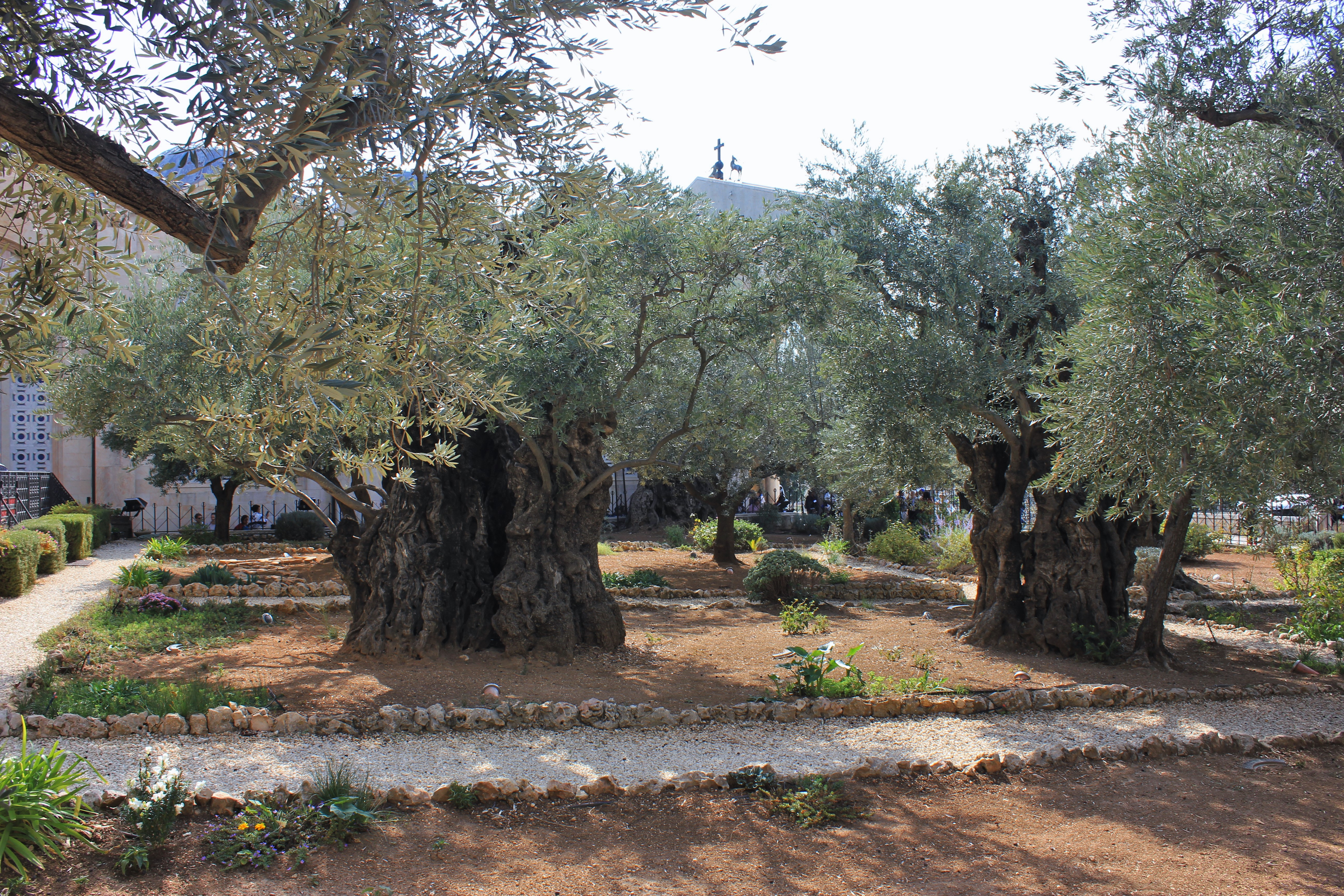
Old olive trees in the Garden of Gethsemane

The olive tree, as well as its fruit and oil, play an important role in Christianity. Apart from being mentioned in the Hebrew Bible (the Christian Old Testament), they appear several times in the New Testament. The Mount of Olives east of Jerusalem figures prominently in the Bible: It is part of the route to Bethany, which is the site of several key biblical events; where Jesus stood when he wept over Jerusalem; and where he ascended to heaven (Acts 1:9–12). Jesus is said to have spent time on the mount, teaching and prophesying to his disciples (Matthew 24–25)—most notably the Olivet Discourse—and returning after each day to rest (Luke 21:37, and John 8:1).

Gethsemane, an olive garden at the foot of the Mount of Olives, whose name derives from the Hebrew word for "oil press", is where Jesus underwent his agonized prayer to God and was ultimately betrayed and arrested before his crucifixion. According to Eastern Orthodox Church tradition, it is where the Virgin Mary was buried and was assumed into heaven after her dormition on Mount Zion. Gethsemane became a focal point for Christian pilgrims during the Middle Ages and remains revered in Christianity; many of its olive trees, which are purportedly among the oldest living trees in the world, are divided among various churches.

The apostle Paul uses the olive tree as an allegory in his Epistle to the Romans, comparing Israelites to a tame olive tree and Gentiles to a wild olive branch (Romans 11:17–24).The cultivated olive tree is pruned and nurtured so as to bear fruit, whereas its barren branches are trimmed and discarded; God has preserved the holy root of Israel so that the wild branches (the Gentiles) can be grafted onto it and thus share in the blessings of the cultivated tree (Israel).

== Islam ==
The olive tree and olive oil are mentioned seven times in the Quran; it is one of a handful of plants to appear by name, along with the fig, date palm, sweet basil, ginger, and grapevine. The olive is praised as a precious fruit and a gift from God (Surah Al-An'am: 99). Muhammad is reported to have said: "Take oil of olive and massage with it—it is a blessed tree" (Sunan al-Darimi, 69:103). Olives are substitutes for dates (if not available) during Ramadan fasting, and olive tree leaves are used as incense in some Muslim Mediterranean countries.

== Palestine ==
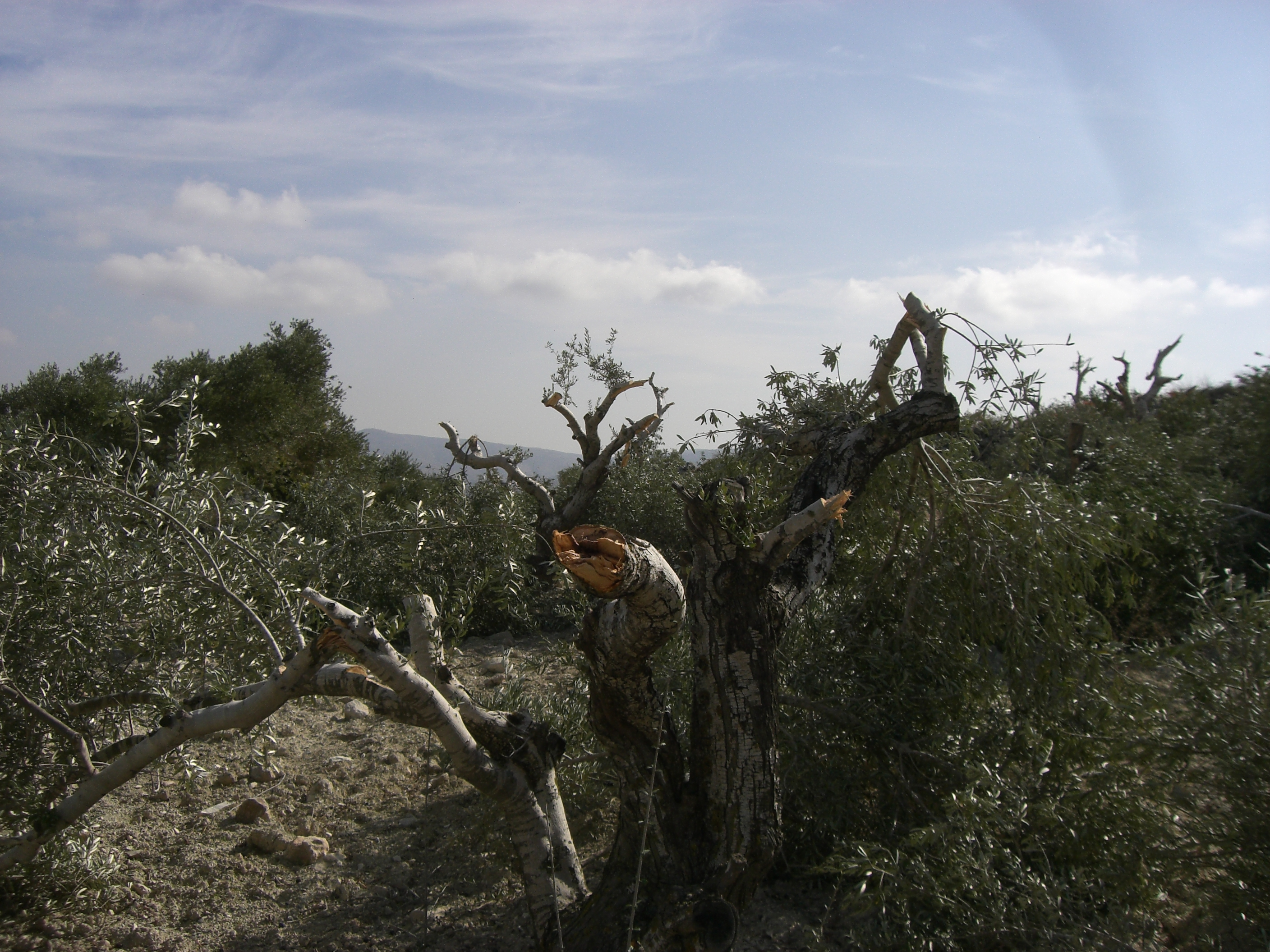
On November 12th, 2009, a group of Jewish settlers from the Israeli settlement of Yitzhar in Area C of the occupied West Bank cut down over 80 olive trees in the Palestinian village of Burin, south of Nablus.

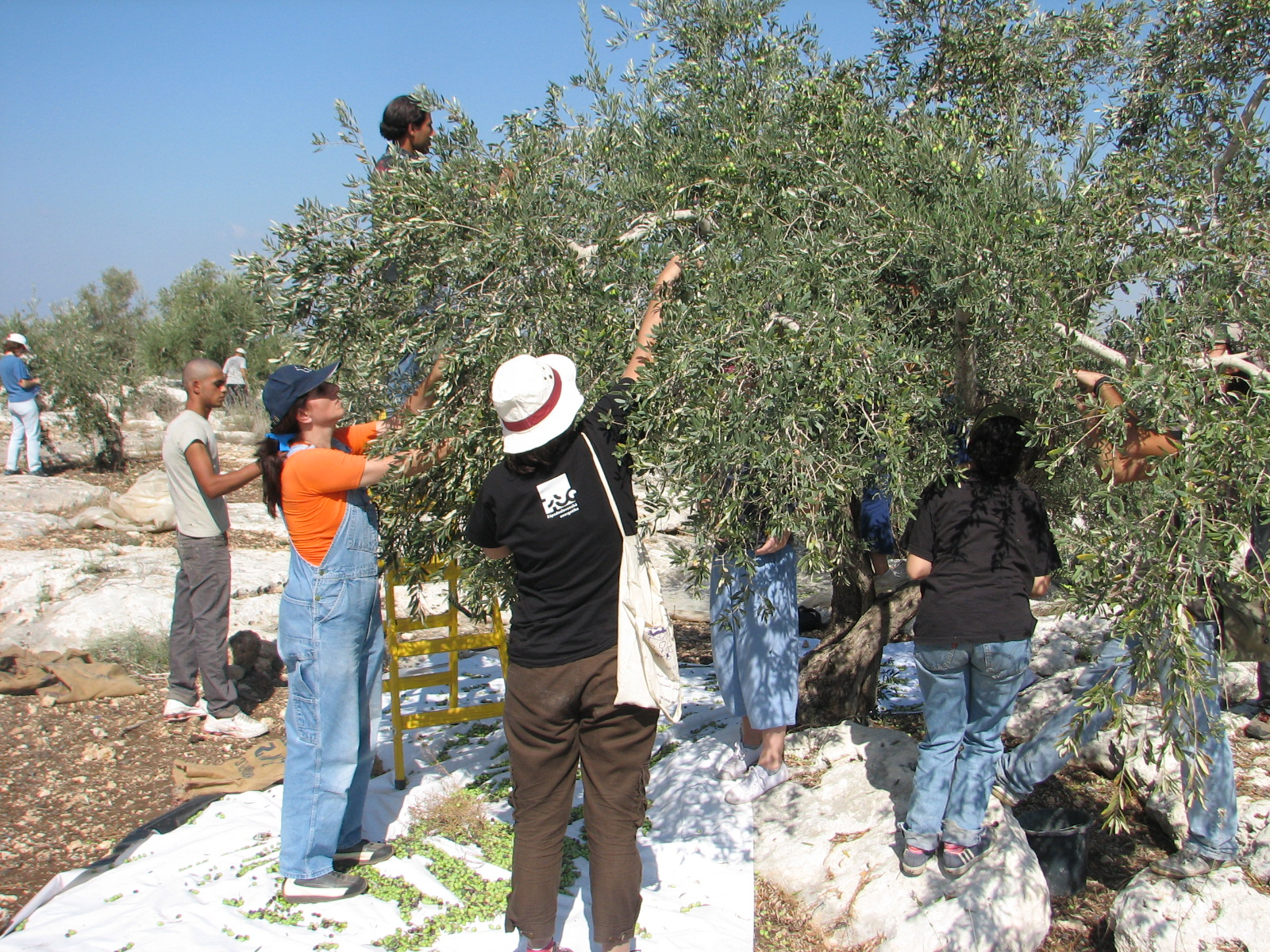
Israelis and Palestinians harvesting olives in the village of Qaffin, northwestern West Bank, in December 2008

In Palestine, the olive tree carries symbolic connotations of resilience, health, ancestral ties, and community. Researchers have found that it represents many Palestinian cultural values such as sutra (سُتْرَة), ʿawana (عَوَنَة), and ṣumūd (صُمُود). Olive trees are also a symbol of Palestinian identity: they are viewed as the first witnesses that Palestine is the homeland of the Palestinian people, and signify the bond between Palestinians and their land. The olive tree is a means of survival and security, serving as the primary source of income for over 800,000 families and accounting for 14 percent of the Palestinian economy. Almost half the cultivated land in the West Bank is planted with about 10 million olive trees.

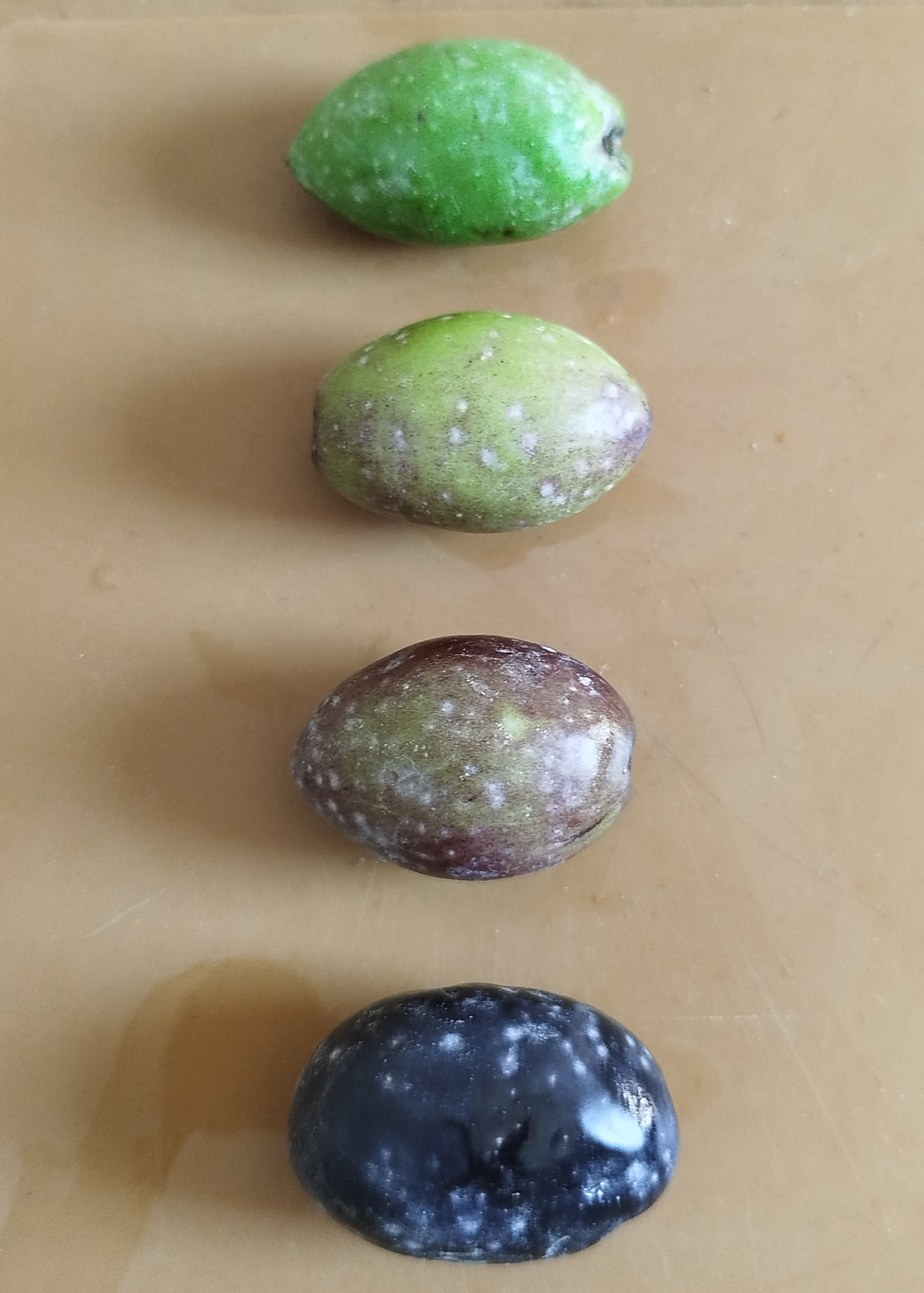
The stages of olive fruit ripening

The harvest season is referred to as "Palestine's wedding" and is considered a national holiday when schools close for two days so that pupils and teachers can join in the harvest. This holiday allows community and family members to gather and serves as a ritual that encompasses their values surrounding family, labour, community and aid for other members of the community that do not possess land. This is practised through the tradition of leaving fruit on a tree during the harvest so that those who do not have land and are unable to take part in the harvest can still reap the benefits.

The olive tree's enduring cultural and economic significance to the Palestinians has put it at the center of the ongoing Israeli–Palestinian conflict; an estimated 800,000 olive trees have been uprooted by Israeli authorities and settlers since 1967, and groves are frequently targeted in attacks or acts of vandalism. These destructions are considered a way to forcibly displace Palestinians and seize their land.

== Israel ==
Due to its importance in the Hebrew Bible, the olive has significant national meaning in modern Israeli culture. Two olive branches appear as part of Israel's emblem, which may have been inspired by the vision of biblical Hebrew prophet Zechariah, who describes seeing a menorah flanked by an olive tree on each side; the trees represent Zerubbabel and Joshua, the governor and high priest, respectively. The olive tree was declared the unofficial national tree of Israel in 2021 by a survey of Israelis; it is often planted during Tu BiShvat and its fruit is a customary part of the accompanying seder.

== United States ==
During the early stage of the American Revolutionary War, the Second Continental Congress of the Thirteen American Colonies issued the "Olive Branch Petition" to Great Britain to prevent further escalation. The Great Seal of the United States, first used in 1782, depicts an eagle clutching an olive branch and arrows in its talons, indicating the power of peace and war, respectively. The eagle is portrayed as casting its gaze towards the olive branch, symbolizing the United States' preference to pursue peace before war.

Thomas Jefferson, a founding father and third president of the United States, was a great admirer of olives and olive oil, regarding the olive tree as "the richest gift of heaven", "one of the most precious productions of nature", and "the most interesting plant in existence". Jefferson's fascination stemmed from his experiences in Europe, particularly France and Italy, while serving as the U.S. Minister to France in the late 1780s. He was impressed by the olive tree's resilience and suitability for various climates, taking detailed notes of its various "virtues" and qualities; he also observed the widespread use of olive oil and encouraged its consumption for its health benefits and ability to provide "a proper and comfortable nourishment" compared to existing staples in the U.S. such as rice.

Jefferson believed the olive tree would be a valuable crop in America and could help alleviate poverty and improve the lives of enslaved people; he wrote letters to various agricultural societies urging them to consider introducing olive cultivation in the U.S., advocating for "an olive tree planted for every American slave", particularly in the American South. Jefferson experimented with growing olive trees at his home in Monticello, Virginia and attempted to establish a domestic olive oil industry, expressing bitter disappointment when this effort failed in the early 1810s.

Jefferson remained a lifelong connoisseur of olive oil, which "had joined the exclusive company of wine and books as a ... 'necessary of life'"; every year until his death, he imported four to five gallons of "virgin oil of Aix" from France, and at least one fragment of an olive oil bottle has been unearthed at Monticello.

== United Nations ==
The flag of the United Nations adopted in 1946 is a world map surrounded by two olive branches. Likewise, a similar design is adopted for the flags of many U.N. agencies and programs, including the International Atomic Energy Agency, International Labour Organization, and World Health Organization.
