= Hellenic Naval Band =

Greek military band

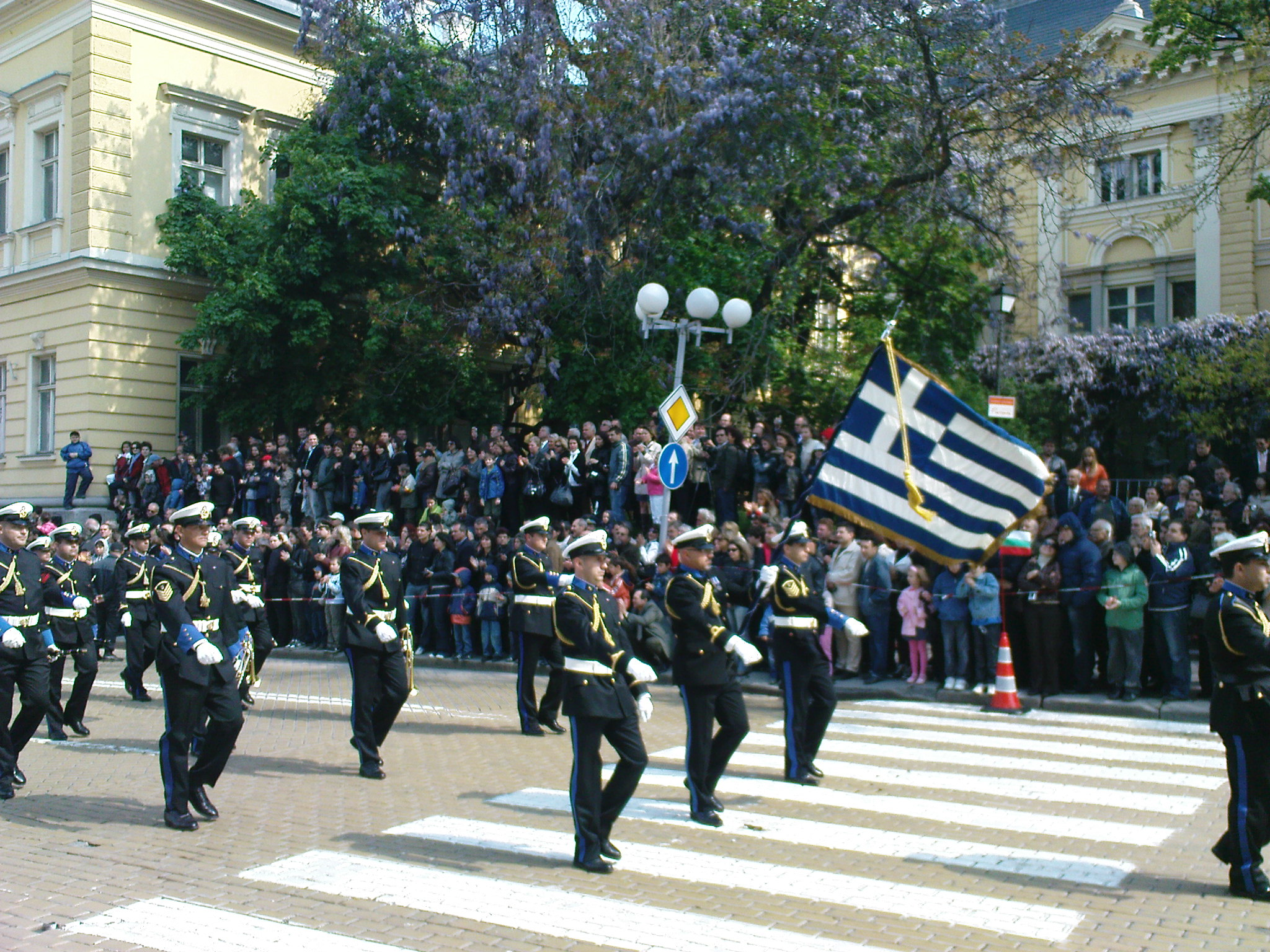
The band in a military parade in Bulgaria, 2009.

The Hellenic Navy Band (Greek: Μπάντα του Ελληνικού Ναυτικού) is a Greek military band which was established in 1879. It is located at the military base in Votanikos, Athens. For more than a century, the band has performed at major state events in Greece on behalf of the Hellenic Navy, as well as on radio and television, and toured extensively abroad. The band participated in the opening ceremony of the 1896 Summer Olympics and in the 2004 Summer Olympics, as well as in several military music festivals in the Europe.

== History ==
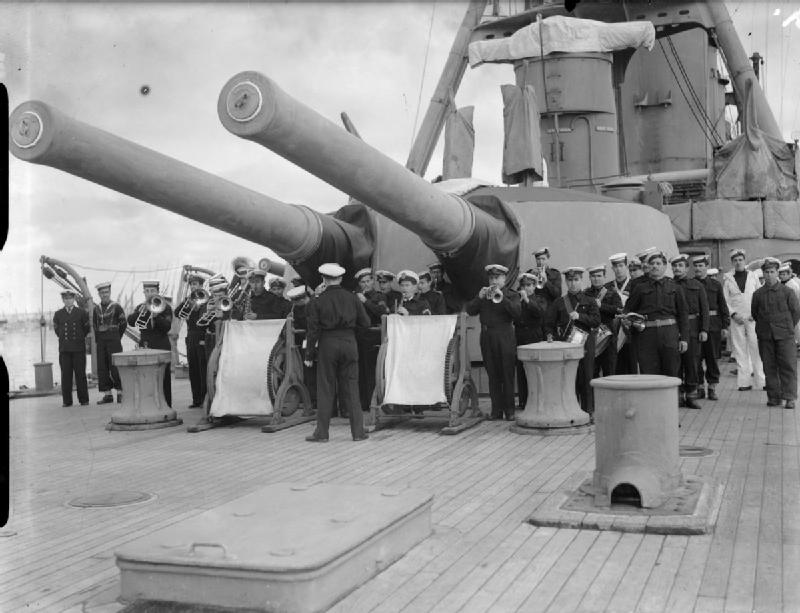
The navy band during the Second World War.

The first musical unit of the Hellenic Navy was formed in April 1879 and consisted of 22 musicians who enlisted as volunteers. The unit became a permanent member of the Flagship of the Fleet. After the Balkan Wars, the number of musicians increased through the expansion of the navy and the enlistment of new volunteers as a result. In August 1925, the School of Musicians and Buglers was founded at the Administration Directorate of the Salamis Naval Base. From 1932 until 1936 the School of music was transferred on Poros, only to be transferred back to Salamis from in 1936, where it would stay until 1941, just before the Battle of Greece. During the Second World War and the Axis occupation of Greece, the band followed the Greek fleet's exodus to the Middle East, installed on the Ionia passenger ship (until 1943) and on the Greek cruiser Georgios Averof (from 1943 onwards). In 1946, the School moved to the Palaska Training Centre in Skaramanga, where it has remained until today. Apart from the School, there are now two permanent bands, one at the Salamis Naval Base and one at the Crete Naval Base in Crete. It has participated in International Military Music Festivals abroad, including those in the Netherlands, Poland, Belgium, France and Malta.
