= Theodosius Nagashima =

His Eminence Theodosius
- Archbishop of Tokyo, Metropolitan of All Japan
- Church: Orthodox Church in Japan
- Installed: March 28, 1972
- Term ended: 7 May, 1999
- Predecessor: Vladimir (Nagosky)
- Successor: Daniel (Nushiro)
- Previous post: Bishop of Kyoto (1969-1972)

Orders
- Ordination: 1964 by Vladimir (Nagosky)
- Consecration: November 2, 1969 by John (Shakhovskoy)

Personal details
- Born: Nagashima Shinji; April 3, 1935 Ōmiya, Saitama Prefecture, Japan
- Died: May 7, 1999 (aged 64) Tokyo, Tokyo Prefecture, Japan
- Denomination: Eastern Orthodox Christianity

Metropolitan Theodosius (テオドシウス大主教, Teodoshiusu dai shukyō) (Russian: Митрополит Феодосий; secular name Basil Nagashima Shinji, Japanese: ワシリイ 永島 新二; April 3, 1935 – May 7, 1999) was primate of the Japanese Orthodox Church, the Autonomous Church of the Moscow Patriarchate, with the title His Eminence Theodosius, Archbishop of Tokyo, Metropolitan of All Japan.

== Biography ==
He was born on April 3, 1935, in the Ōmiya (now in the city of Saitama), Saitama Prefecture, Japan, in a Buddhist family.

While studying in elementary school, he attended the Holy Resurrection Cathedral (nikorai-dō) in Tokyo to listen to Eastern Orthodox hymns. Nagashima Shinji began to attend an educational missionary circle, and in 1952 he was baptized with the name Basil. Nagashima's father and two brothers also converted to Orthodoxy.

After completing his secondary education, he was preparing to enter university, but conversion to Orthodoxy changed his views, and in 1954 he entered the newly revived Tokyo Theological Seminary. On February 5, 1958, together with other seminarians, he founded the religious magazine "The Way" ("michi"). Although the magazine ceased publication after four issues, it served as the beginning of Nagashima's writing and publishing works.

After graduating from the seminary in 1958, Basil Nagashima was sent as a catechist to the church in the name of the Great Martyr Demetrius of Thessalonica in the city of Yamato. At the same time, he assumed the duties of editor of the official Japanese church newspaper Orthodox Bulletin (seikyō jihō). After that, he served as a catechist in the Kanda district church (Tokyo) for two years, and in July 1962 he was transferred to the Apostle James Church in Kagoshima City. Here he continued his catechetical ministry, often visiting the remote borders of Kyushu Island with missionary visits.

In 1964 Bishop Vladimir (Nagosky) ordained catechist Basil a deacon and soon a presbyter. While in Kyushu, Fr. Basil began to express a desire to become a monk, and in July 1965 Bishop Vladimir sent him to the United States for obedience to St. Tikhon's Monastery in South Canaan, Pennsylvania, where Saint Tikhon's Orthodox Theological Seminary also located. From America, the priest Basil wrote to Bishop Vladimir that he had strengthened his desire to become a monk; nevertheless, in July 1967, he was recalled to Japan and returned to serve at the church in Kagoshima City.

By 1969, when the Orthodox Church in Japan was on the verge of gaining autonomy, it became necessary to elect bishops from the Japanese. On October 19, at an extraordinary meeting on this issue, two candidates were elected – Hierodeacon Seraphim (Sigrist) and priest Basil (Nagashima), who, obeying the will of the Church, took vows with the name Theodosius in honor of St. Theodosius of Chernigov. On November 2, 1969, in accordance with the decision of the Bishops' Council of the Northern American Metropolis, Archimandrite Theodosius was consecrated Bishop of Kyoto. The consecration was performed by Archbishop John (Shakhovskoy) of San Francisco and Bishop Vladimir (Nagosky) of Tokyo.

The structure and administrative institutions of the autonomous Church were determined at two Councils in 1970 – the annual July Council and the Extraordinary Council on November 15–16. In accordance with the Patriarchal Tomos, three dioceses were established in the Japanese Church: Archdiocese of Tokyo, headed by the primate; the Diocese of Western Japan centered in Kyoto, headed by Bishop Theodosius, and the Diocese of Eastern Japan centered in Sendai

On February 10, 1972, Metropolitan Vladimir (Nagosky) sent a notice to the Japanese clergy about his resignation from the post of primate of the Japanese Orthodox Church, at the same time sending a petition for admission to the number of bishops of the Orthodox Church of America. He appointed Bishop Theodosius (Nagashima) of Kyoto as the locum tenens of the Church. The issue of electing a new primate turned out to be difficult: the most relevant candidate, Bishop Theodosius, has not yet gained proper authority among the clergy and believers, and therefore the Japanese leadership of the Church, headed by Fr. Basil Takeoka began to openly speak out against the election of a new primate, offering to grant all powers to the Metropolitan Council.

The issue of replacing the see of Tokyo was resolved at an extraordinary Council on March 19, 1972. In addition to the three bishops of the Japanese Church, Archbishop Juvenal (Poyarkov), Deputy Chairman of the DECR, attended it, whose main task was to convince the Japanese clergy that the existence of the Church without a ruling bishop did not comply with canonical rules and, therefore, would not be approved by the Moscow Patriarchate. Metropolitan Vladimir also stressed the need to elect a successor, expressing the opinion that for the further development of the Church, turning it into a "truly Japanese" one, it is necessary to have a Japanese primate, he recommended Bishop Theodosius to the council. Archbishop Juvenal, for his part, also assured the participants that the Moscow had no objections to a Japanese occupying the metropolitan see, although, of course, if they wished to receive a bishop from the Russian Orthodox Church, the Patriarch would not ignore this request either. Convinced that the nomination of a new primate was an urgent need, the delegates of the Council chose the Japanese: the decision in favor of Bishop Theodosius (Nagashima) of Kyoto and Western Japan was made unanimously. On March 21, 1972, the Holy Synod of the Russian Orthodox Church granted Metropolitan Vladimir's request for resignation and approved the candidacy of a new primate. On March 27, 1972, Archbishop Juvenal and a delegation of the autonomous Church headed by Bishop Theodosius flew to the USSR. On March 28 of the same year, Patriarch Pimen of Moscow headed the enthronement of the new primate.

At first, Metropolitan Theodosius had to make considerable efforts to overcome the skeptical attitude of part of the Orthodox flock towards him and the inertia of the elders of the diocesan administration; at the same time, three months later, Nikorai-dō parishioners noted that the new bishop "in relation to believers ... holds himself much higher and more unapproachable compared to Metropolitan Vladimir". Metropolitan Theodosius was supported mainly by people of his generation, graduates of St. Vladimir's Seminary: he promoted 39-year-old priest Sabbas Onami, who served in Yamate Parish and served as metropolitan translator and secretary, to the position of head of the Tokyo Consistory; In the Diocese of Kyoto, an important role was played by 41-year—old Archpriest Cyril Arihara, rector of the Osaka Church, and the rector of the Kobe parish, 36-year-old priest Proclus Ushimaru, a classmate of Metropolitan Theodosius at the Tokyo Seminary, a church historian and the only employee of the Department of External Relations of the Japanese Orthodox Church. In Sendai, the burden of diocesan affairs rested on 39-year-old priest Justin Yamaguchi. Already at the Council in July 1972, a number of relocations were made in the Church on the initiative of the new primate: according to the servants of the Patriarchal Compound in Tokyo, "all those who were in good relations with the former Metropolitan Vladimir turned out to be far on the periphery".

Under Metropolitan Theodosius, the problem of the development of monastic life remained unresolved: apart from the St. Sophia Monastery in Chiba, which was a private initiative of Bishop Nicholas (Sayama), not a single monastery was founded in Japan. The absence of the institution of monasticism, in turn, made it difficult for the succession of episcopal authority in the three departments of the autonomous Church.

He died on May 7, 1999. On May 13 of the same year, at 13:00, his funeral service was held at the Holy Resurrection Cathedral in Tokyo, which was performed by: Archbishop Clement (Kapalin) of Kaluga and Borovsk, Archbishop Herman (Swaiko) of Philadelphia and Pennsylvania (Orthodox Church in America), rector of St. Sophia Monastery in Chiba Archbishop Nicholas (Sayama) of Ramenskoye, Bishop Sotirios (Trambas) of Seoul and Korea (Ecumenical Patriarchate of Constantinople), Archpriest John Udics (Orthodox Church in America), Archpriest Nikolai Katsyuban and twenty-four priests of the Japanese Orthodox Church. The funeral service was performed according to the priestly rite in the Church Slavonic and Classical Japanese languages. Under the funeral bells and the singing of the Irmos of the Great Canon "Helper and Patron", the coffin with the body of the deceased archpastor was surrounded by the clergy around the cathedral. The archpastors and priests performed the last requiem mass in front of the cathedral. Metropolitan Theodosius was buried at the Yanaka Cemetery, where the tomb of Equal-to-the-Apostles Nicholas of Japan is located, and where Metropolitan Sergius (Tikhomirov) and Bishop Nicholas (Ono) was also buried.

== Literature ==
- "Архиепископ Токийский, Митрополит всей Японии Феодосий" (PDF). Журнал Московской Патриархии (in Russian) (6): 32. 1972.
- Саблина, Элеонора (2006). 150 лет Православия в Японии : история Японской Православной Церкви и ее основатель Святитель Николай (PDF) (in Russian). Москва: АИРО-XXI; Санкт-Петербург: Дмитрий Буланин. ISBN 5-91022-026-8.
- Суханова, Наталья (2013). История Японской Православной Церкви в XX веке: путь к автономии (PDF). «Богословская и церковно-историческая библиотека» (in Russian). СПб.: Алетейя. ISBN 978-5-91419-564-6.
