= Glory Film Co. =

British film production company

Glory Film Co. was established to produce the cinema film 'The Troop' which had a Royal Premiere at BAFTA in the presence of The Princess Royal. Shot in 35mm CinemaScope the film features The King's Troop, Royal Horse Artillery and has a narrative introduction by Oscar-winning actor John Mills (Ryan's Daughter).

== Cinema Projects ==
Following its involvement in The Troop, FujiFilm commissioned Glory Film Co. to make a series of films to demonstrate its new motion picture filmstocks. For these projects Glory employed leading cinematographers: Oscar-winners Jack Cardiff OBE, BSC, ASC, (The African Queen) and Ronnie Taylor BSC (Gandhi) together with Phedon Papamichael ASC (Walk the Line), John de Borman BSC (The Full Monty), Sue Gibson BSC (Spooks), Thierry Arbogast AFC (The Fifth Element), Ron Stanett CSC (Evel Knievel) and Tony Pierce-Roberts BSC (A Room With a View). The films were shot at Pinewood (LightsII) and Shepperton studios (Lights II, Return of The Shadow), with locations including Hastings in East Sussex (The Glow). 'Lights II' (2005) featured the last cinema performance of John Mills (at age 96).

== Charitable Projects ==
In addition to commercial and entertainment projects, Glory Film Co. contributes time and resources to realising charitable film projects such as 'Riding for The Disabled' (featuring the Princess Royal), 'Outreach', 'The Spinal Injury Patient Film' (that won an international Telly Award in 2012), and 'Mobility and Enablement'.
