= Air raids on Japan =

Aerial bombing of Japan during World War II

- Part of the Japan campaign during the Pacific War
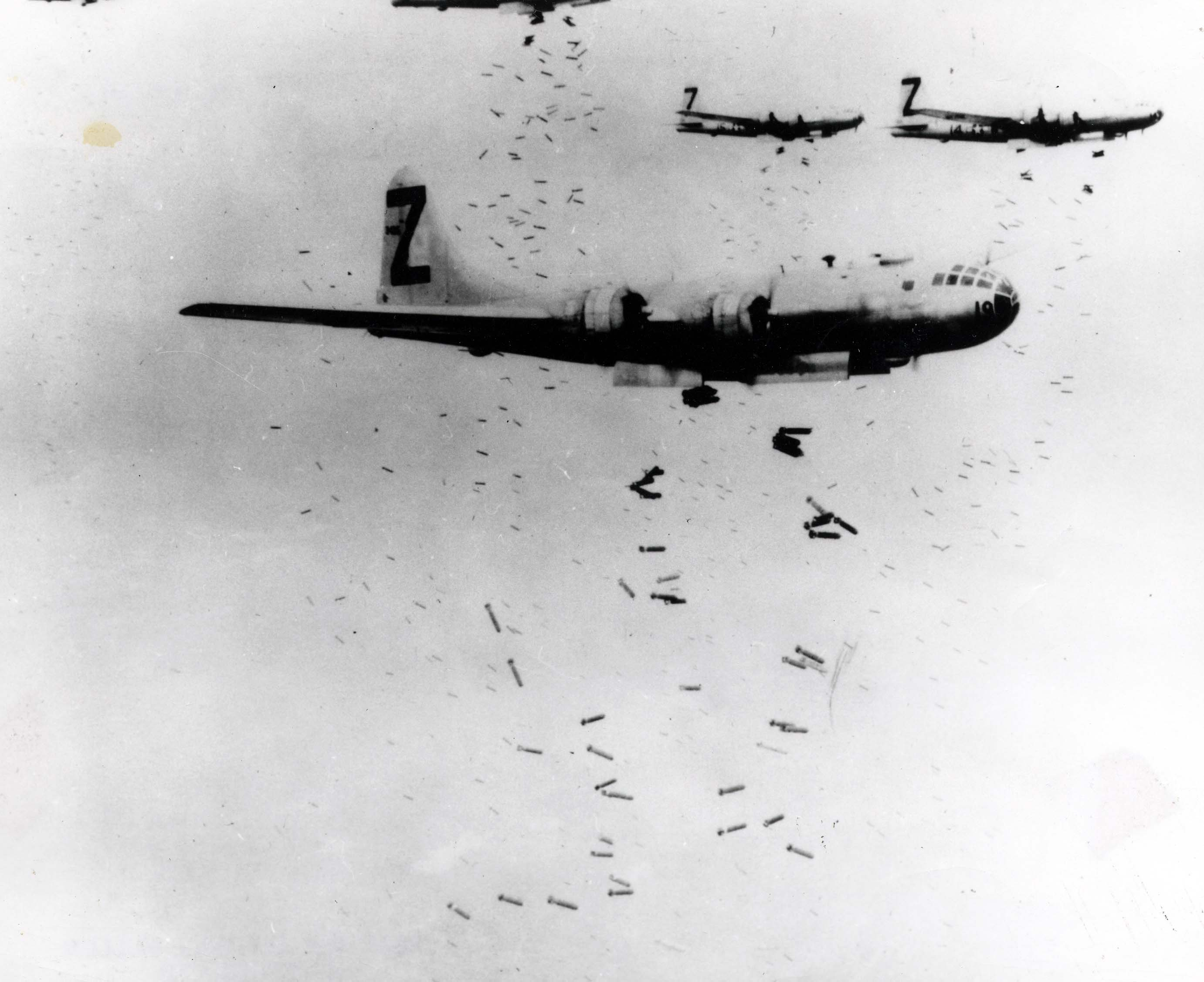
- B-29 Superfortress bombers dropping incendiary bombs on Yokohama in May 1945
Date	18 April 1942 – 15 August 1945
Location	Japanese home islands
Result	Allied victory

Belligerents
United States; United Kingdom; China	Japan

Units involved
(United States) Fifth Air Force (United States) Seventh Air Force (United States) Eleventh Air Force (United States) Twentieth Air Force (United States) 3rd Fleet (United States) 5th Fleet (United Kingdom) British Pacific Fleet (Republic of China (1912–1949)) Republic of China Air Force	(Empire of Japan) Northern District (Empire of Japan) Eastern District (Empire of Japan) Central District (Empire of Japan) Western District (Empire of Japan) General Defense Command (Empire of Japan) Air General Army

Strength
27,261 B-29 sorties, exclusive of mining operations	2,833 heavy AA guns 5,916 automatic cannons 168,900 personnel

Casualties and losses
5th Air Force: 31 aircraft 7th Air Force: 12 aircraft VII Fighter Command(as part of the 20th AF): 157 aircraft 91 killed 20th Air Force: 414 aircraft 2,600+ killed ~545 Allied airmen captured	241,000–900,000 killed 213,000–1,300,000 wounded 8,500,000 rendered homeless Very heavy damage to industry Extensive damage to urban areas 4,200 aircraft

Allied forces conducted air raids on Japan from 1942 to 1945, causing extensive destruction to the country's cities and killing between 241,000 and 900,000 people. During the first years of the Pacific War these attacks were limited to the Doolittle Raid in April 1942 and small-scale raids on Japanese military positions in the Kuril Islands from mid-1943. Strategic bombing raids began in June 1944 and continued with increasing intensity until the end of the war in August 1945. Allied naval and land-based tactical air units also attacked Japan during 1945.

The United States Army Air Forces (USAAF) campaign against Japan began in earnest in mid-1944. While plans for attacks on the Japanese home islands had been prepared prior to the Pacific War, these could not begin until the long-range Boeing B-29 Superfortress bomber was ready for combat and produced at scale. From June 1944 until January 1945, B-29s stationed in India and staged through bases in China made nine raids on targets in western Japan, but this effort proved ineffective. The strategic bombing campaign was greatly expanded from November 1944, when airfields in the Mariana Islands became available as a result of the Mariana Islands Campaign. Initial attempts to target industrial facilities using high-altitude daylight "precision" bombing were ineffective in significantly degrading Japanese war economy. Much of the Japanese military industry's early-stage manufacturing process was carried out in small, geographically disparate workshops and private homes, reducing the effectiveness of bombing larger factories. Partially in an attempt to address this, beginning February 1945 the USAAF transitioned to a strategy of low-altitude nighttime firebombing against urban areas. This approach caused severe damage to Japan's industrial output, while resulting in widespread urban destruction and high civilian casualties. On 6 and 9 August 1945, the cities of Hiroshima and Nagasaki were mostly destroyed after being struck by American atomic bombs.

Japan's military and civil defenses were ultimately unable to stop or meaningfully hinder Allied air attacks. The number of fighter aircraft and anti-aircraft guns assigned to defensive duties in the home islands was inadequate, and most of these aircraft and guns had difficulty reaching the high altitudes at which B-29s often operated in daytime raids, or operating effectively against them at night. Acute fuel shortages, inadequate pilot training, and a lack of coordination between units also constrained the effectiveness of the fighter force. By June 1945, the Japanese military had decided to cease contesting most Allied air raids, in an effort to stockpile aircraft for defense during the impending invasion of the home islands. Despite the vulnerability of Japanese cities to incendiary bombs, local and municipal firefighting services lacked adequate training and equipment, and few air raid shelters were constructed for civilians. Facing insufficient anti-aircraft defenses, American B-29s were able to inflict severe damage on urban areas, while suffering few losses.

The Allied bombing campaign was one of the main factors that influenced the Japanese government's decision to surrender in mid-August 1945. The morality of large-scale attacks on Japanese cities has been subject to widespread debate, and the American decision to use atomic weapons has been particularly controversial. The most commonly cited estimate of Japanese casualties from the raids is 333,000 killed and 473,000 wounded. Other estimates of total fatalities range from 241,000 to 900,000. In addition to causing extensive loss of civilian life, the raids contributed to a large decline in Japanese industrial production.

== Background ==
=== United States plans ===
In 1940, United States Army Air Corps, which was subsumed by the United States Army Air Forces (USAAF) in February 1942, began developing contingency plans for an air campaign against Japan. That same year, the naval attaché to the Embassy of the United States in Tokyo reported that Japan's civil defenses were weak, and proposals were made for American aircrew to volunteer for service with Chinese forces in the Second Sino-Japanese War. The first American Volunteer Group (the "Flying Tigers") began operations as part of the Republic of China Air Force (ROCAF) in late 1941 using P-40 Warhawk fighter aircraft. A second American Volunteer Group was formed in late 1941 and tasked with attacking Japanese targets from bases in China using Hudson and A-20 Havoc medium bombers. The attack on Pearl Harbor on 7 December 1941 led to open hostilities between the United States and Japan and ended the need for covert operations, however, and this unit did not become active. The small number of Second Air Volunteer Group personnel who were dispatched from the United States in November 1941 were diverted to Australia upon the outbreak of war.

Japanese battlefield successes during the opening months of the Pacific War nullified prewar US plans for air raids against the Japanese homeland, and a series of attempts to start a small-scale bombing campaign from bases in China proved unsuccessful. Before the outbreak of war, the USAAF had planned to bomb Japan from Wake Island, Guam, the Philippines and coastal areas in China. However, these areas were rapidly captured by Japanese forces in late 1941 and early 1942, and the USAAF heavy bomber force in the Philippines was largely destroyed when Japanese aircraft attacked Clark Air Base on 8 December 1941.

In March and April 1942, the USAAF attempted to send thirteen heavy bombers to China to attack the Japanese home islands. These aircraft reached India, but remained there as the Japanese conquest of Burma caused logistical problems and Chinese Nationalist leader Chiang Kai-shek was reluctant to allow them to operate from territory under his control. A further thirteen B-24 Liberator heavy bombers were dispatched from the United States to operate from China in May 1942 as the HALPRO force, but were ultimately re-tasked to support Allied operations in the Mediterranean.

In July 1942, the commander of the American Volunteer Group, Colonel Claire Lee Chennault, sought a force of 100 P-47 Thunderbolt fighters and 30 B-25 Mitchell medium bombers, which he believed would be sufficient to "destroy" the Japanese aircraft industry. Three months later, Chennault told United States President Franklin D. Roosevelt that a force of 105 modern fighters and 40 bombers, including twelve heavy bombers, would be able to "accomplish the downfall of Japan" within six to twenty-three months. The USAAF headquarters did not regard these claims as credible, and Chennault's requests for reinforcements were not granted.

=== Pre-war Japanese defenses ===
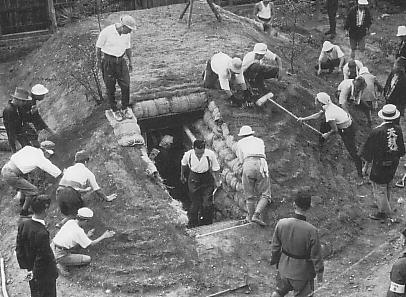
An air-raid shelter being built in Japan, September 1940

The Japanese government's pre-war air defense strategy to protect the home islands focused on neutralizing enemy air bases. Prior to the war, Japanese strategists believed that Soviet aircraft based in the Russian Far East posed the greatest threat to the Japanese mainland. The Japanese military planned to destroy Soviet air bases within range of the home islands if Japan and the Soviet Union ever went to war. The Soviet Union and Japan only entered hostilities in the final month of the war, by which time Japan lacked the air strength to attack Soviet targets in the Far East.

When the Pacific War began in 1941, the Japanese government believed that the best way to prevent American air raids was to capture and hold the areas in China and the Pacific from which such attacks could be launched. It was expected that the Allies would be unable to re-capture these bases. The Japanese anticipated that the Allies might still make small-scale attacks against the home islands using carrier aircraft. The government chose not to develop strong domestic air defense capabilities, as Japan's industrial resources were unable to maintain offensive air forces in China and the Pacific while also providing an effective defense for the home islands.

Few air units or anti-aircraft batteries were stationed in the home islands during the early months of the Pacific War. In July 1941, the General Defense Command (GDC) was formed to oversee the defense of the home islands. All combat units in this area were assigned to the four regional military districts, the Northern, Eastern, Central and Western districts, which reported directly to the Ministry of War. As a result, the GDC's functions were limited to coordinating communications between the Imperial General Headquarters—Japan's highest military decision-making body—and the military districts.

In early 1942, forces allocated to the defense of Japan comprised 100 Imperial Japanese Army Air Force (IJAAF) and 200 Imperial Japanese Navy (IJN) fighter aircraft, many of which were obsolete, and 500 IJA and 200 IJN anti-aircraft guns. Most of the IJAAF and IJN formations in the home islands were training units with limited ability to counter Allied attacks. The IJA also operated a network of military and civilian observation posts to provide early warning of air attack, and was building a series of radar stations. Command and control of these air defenses was fragmented. The IJAAF and IJN did not coordinate their activities or communicate effectively with each other. As a result, domestic Japanese air defenses were unable to react to a sudden air attack.

Japanese cities were highly vulnerable to damage from firebombing due to their construction, layout and the weak state of Japan's civil defense organizations. Urban areas were typically congested, and most buildings were constructed from highly flammable materials such as paper and wood. Industrial and military facilities in urban areas were often surrounded by densely populated residential buildings. Despite these vulnerabilities, few cities had full-time professional firefighters and relied mostly on volunteers. Professional firefighting forces lacked modern equipment and used outdated tactics. Air raid drills had been held in Tokyo and Osaka since 1928, and from 1937 local governments were required to provide civilians with manuals that explained how to respond to air attacks. Regardless, few air-raid shelters and other air defense facilities for civilians and industry were constructed prior to the Pacific War.

== Early raids ==
=== Chinese raid ===
The Republic of China Air Force (ROCAF) conducted a single attack on the Japanese home islands during the Second Sino-Japanese War. On 19 May 1938 two ROCAF Martin B-10 bombers dropped propaganda on Nagasaki, Fukuoka, Kurume, Saga and other locations on Kyushu. These leaflets did not have a meaningful effect on Japanese civilians, but demonstrated that China could potentially conduct small-scale air attacks on Japan. The Japanese military later incorrectly concluded that the ROCAF had aircraft capable of mounting attacks at a range of 1,300 miles (2,100 km) from their bases, and took precautions against potential raids on western Japan when Chinese forces launched an offensive during 1939.

=== Doolittle Raid ===
USAAF aircraft bombed Japan for the first time in mid-April 1942. In an operation conducted primarily to raise morale in the United States and to symbolically avenge the attack on Pearl Harbor, sixteen B-25 Mitchell medium bombers were transported from San Francisco to within range of Japan on the aircraft carrier USS Hornet. These aircraft were launched on 18 April, and individually bombed targets in Tokyo, Yokohama, Yokosuka, Nagoya and Kobe. Local Japanese air defense units were taken by surprise, and all the B-25s escaped without serious damage. The aircraft then continued to China and the Soviet Union, though several crashed in Japanese-held territory after running out of fuel. Japanese casualties were 50 killed and over 400 wounded. About 200 houses were also destroyed.

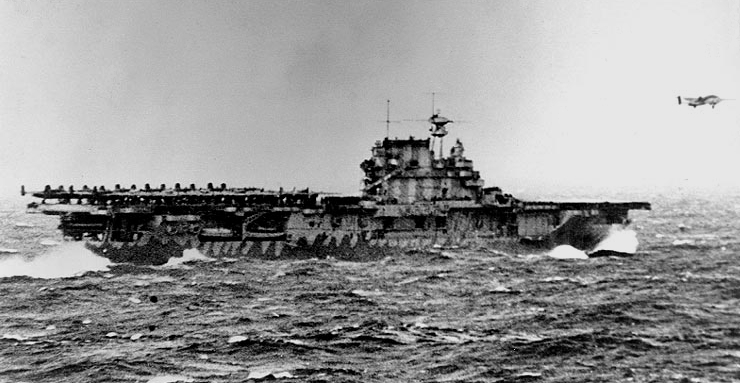
A B-25 Mitchell taking off from USS Hornet on 18 April 1942

Although the Doolittle Raid caused minimal damage, it had several other important ramifications. The attack raised morale in the United States and its commander, Lieutenant Colonel James H. Doolittle, was seen as a war hero. The weak state of the country's air defenses greatly embarrassed the Japanese military leadership, and four fighter groups were transferred from the Pacific to defend the home islands. Partially in an attempt to prevent further naval air raids, the IJN launched an offensive in the Pacific Ocean which ended in defeat at the Battle of Midway. The Japanese Army also conducted the Zhejiang-Jiangxi campaign to capture the airfields in central China at which the Doolittle Raiders had intended to land. This offensive achieved its objectives and resulted in the deaths of 250,000 Chinese soldiers and civilians; many of these civilian deaths were due to war crimes. The destruction of these airfields and heavy casualties incurred during the fighting badly damaged China's war effort. The IJA also began developing fire balloons capable of carrying incendiary and anti-personnel bombs from Japan to the continental United States.

=== Bombing of the Kuril Islands ===
Following the Doolittle Raid, the next air attacks on Japan were made against the Kuril Islands in mid-1943. The liberation of Alaska's Attu Island in May 1943 during the Aleutian Islands campaign provided the USAAF with airfields within range of the Kurils. As part of the preparations for the liberation of Kiska Island in the Aleutians, the Eleventh Air Force conducted a series of raids against the Kurils to suppress Japanese air units stationed there. The first of these attacks was made against southern Shumshu and northern Paramushiru by eight B-25s on 10 July. The Kurils were attacked again on 18 July by six B-24 Liberator heavy bombers, and the unopposed liberation of Kiska (Operation Cottage) took place on 15 August.

The Eleventh Air Force and U.S. Navy units continued to make small-scale raids on the Kuril Islands until the closing months of the war. The USAAF attacks were broken off for five months following a raid on 11 September 1943 when nine of the twenty B-24s and B-25s dispatched were lost, but raids by US Navy PBY Catalinas continued. In response to the American attacks, the IJN established the North-East Area Fleet in August 1943, and in November that year Japanese fighter strength in the Kurils and Hokkaidō peaked at 260 aircraft. The Eleventh Air Force resumed offensive operations in February 1944 after it had been reinforced with two squadrons of P-38 Lightning escort fighters, and it continued to attack targets in the Kurils until June 1945. While these raids caused little damage, they caused the Japanese to divert large numbers of aircraft and other military assets to defend their northern islands against a potential United States invasion.

== Operation Matterhorn ==
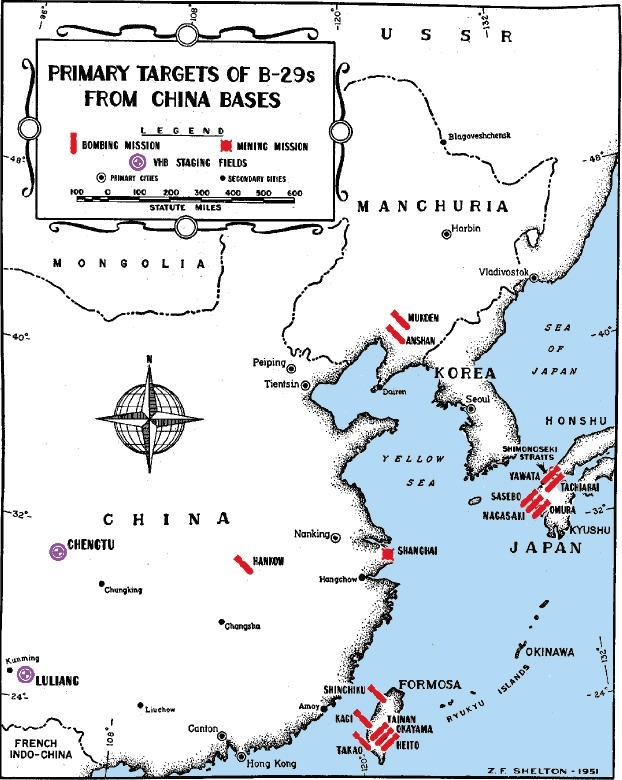
Locations of B-29 bomber bases in China and the main targets they attacked in East Asia during Operation Matterhorn

=== Preparations ===
In late 1943, the United States Joint Chiefs of Staff approved a proposal to begin the strategic air campaign against the Japanese home islands and East Asia by basing B-29 Superfortress heavy bombers in India and establishing forward airfields in China. This strategy, designated Operation Matterhorn, involved the construction of large airstrips near Chengdu in inland China which would be used to refuel B-29s traveling from bases in Bengal en route to targets in Japan. Chennault, by now the commander of the Fourteenth Air Force in China, advocated building the B-29 bases near Guilin, closer to Japan, but this area was judged too vulnerable to counterattack. However, the decision to build airstrips at Chengdu meant that Kyūshū was the only part of the home island chain within the B-29's 1,600-mile (2,600 km) combat radius. Construction of the airfields began in January 1944, and the project involved around 300,000 conscripted Chinese labourers and 75,000 contracted workers.

XX Bomber Command was assigned responsibility for Operation Matterhorn, and its ground crew began to leave the United States for India during December 1943. The Twentieth Air Force was formed in April 1944 to oversee all B-29 operations. In an unprecedented move, the commander of the USAAF, General Henry H. Arnold, took personal command of this unit and ran it from the Pentagon in Washington, D.C. The 58th Bombardment Wing was XX Bomber Command's main combat unit, and its movement from Kansas to India took place between April and mid-May 1944.

The Japanese military began transferring fighter aircraft to the home islands from China and the Pacific in early 1944 in anticipation of B-29 raids. Japanese intelligence detected the construction of B-29 bases in India and China, and the military began to develop plans to counter air raids originating from China. The three IJAAF air brigades stationed in Honshū and Kyūshū were expanded to air divisions between March and June (these were designated the 10th, 11th and 12th Air Divisions). By late June the air defense units in the home islands were assigned 260 fighters, and could draw on approximately 500 additional aircraft during emergencies. Additional anti-aircraft gun batteries and searchlight units were also established to protect major cities and military bases. The GDC's authority was strengthened when the army units in the Eastern, Central and Western military districts were placed under its command in May. The IJN defensive fighter units stationed at Kure, Sasebo and Yokosuka were also assigned to the GDC in July, but cooperation between the GDC's Army units and the much smaller number of naval units was poor. Despite these improvements, Japan's air defenses remained inadequate as few aircraft and anti-aircraft guns could effectively engage B-29s at their cruising altitude of 30,000 feet (9,100 m) and the number of radar stations capable of providing early warning of raids was insufficient.

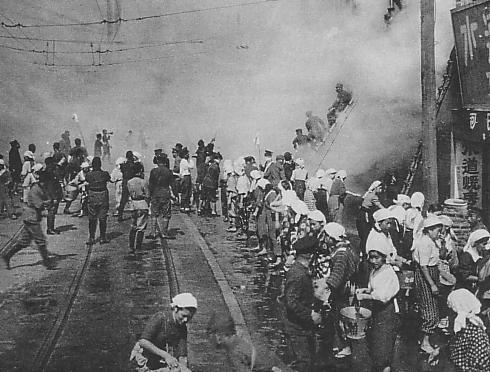
Civilians participating in an air-raid drill during 1942

The Japanese government also sought to improve the country's civil defenses in response to the Doolittle Raid and the threat of further attacks. The national government placed the burden of constructing civilian air-raid shelters on the prefectural governments. However, few shelters were built due to shortages of concrete and steel. In October 1943 the Home Ministry directed households in the major cities to build their own shelters, though these were normally only trenches. A small number of sophisticated shelters were constructed for air defense headquarters and to protect key telephone facilities. However, less than 2 percent of civilians had access to bombproof air-raid shelters, though tunnels and natural caves were also used to protect civilians from B-29 raids. Following the outbreak of war, the Home Ministry expanded the number of firefighters, though these generally remained volunteers who lacked adequate training and equipment. Civilians were also trained to fight fires and encouraged to swear an "air defense oath" to respond to attacks from incendiary or high explosive bombs.

From autumn 1943 the Japanese government took further steps to prepare the country's major cities for air attacks. An air defense general headquarters was established in November and a program of demolishing large numbers of buildings in major cities to create firebreaks began the next month. By the end of the war 614,000 housing units had been destroyed to clear firebreaks; these accounted for a fifth of all housing losses in Japan during the war and displaced 3.5 million people. The government also encouraged old people, children and women in cities that were believed likely to be attacked to move to the countryside from December 1943, and a program of evacuating entire classes of schoolchildren was implemented. By August 1944, 330,000 schoolchildren had been evacuated in school groups and another 459,000 had moved to the countryside with their family. Little was done to disperse industrial facilities to make them less vulnerable to attack, however, as this was logistically difficult.

=== Attacks from China ===
XX Bomber Command began flying missions against Japan in mid-June 1944. The first raid took place on the night of 15 and 16 June when 75 B-29s were dispatched to attack the Imperial Iron and Steel Works at Yawata in northern Kyūshū. This attack caused little damage and cost seven B-29s, but received enthusiastic media coverage in the United States and indicated to Japanese civilians that the war was not going well. The Japanese military began expanding the fighter force in the home islands after the attack on Yawata, and by October, 375 aircraft were assigned to the three air defense air divisions. These divisions remained at about this strength until March 1945. Arnold relieved XX Bomber Command's commander, Brigadier General Kenneth Wolfe, shortly after the raid on Yawata when he was unable to make follow-up attacks on Japan due to insufficient fuel stockpiles at the bases in China. Wolfe's replacement was Major General Curtis LeMay, a veteran of Eighth Air Force bombing attacks against Germany.

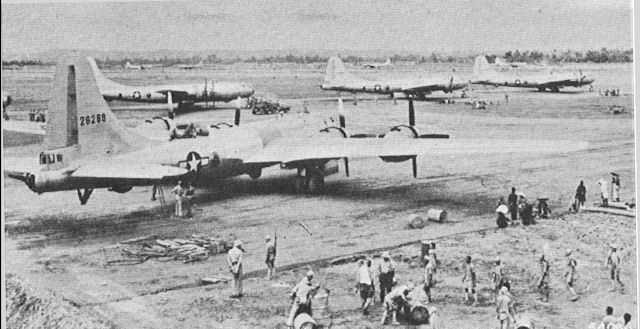
B-29s about to raid Yawata on 15 June 1944

Subsequent B-29 raids staging through China generally did not meet their objectives. The second raid took place on 7 July when seventeen B-29s attacked Sasebo, Ōmura and Tobata, causing little damage, and on the night of 10 and 11 August twenty-four Superfortresses attacked Nagasaki. Another unsuccessful raid was conducted against Yawata on 20 August in which the B-29 force was intercepted by over 100 fighters. Twelve of the 61 Superfortresses that reached the target area were shot down, including one which was destroyed in a suicide ramming attack. Japanese government propaganda claimed that 100 bombers had been downed during this attack, and one of the crashed B-29s was placed on display in Tokyo. XX Bomber Command's performance improved after LeMay instituted a training program and improved the organization of the B-29 maintenance units during August and September. A raid against Ōmura on 25 October destroyed the city's small aircraft factory, though a follow-up raid on 11 November ended in failure. The city was attacked again by 61 B-29s on 21 November and by seventeen bombers on 19 December. XX Bomber Command made its ninth and final raid on Japan on 6 January 1945 when 28 B-29s once again struck Ōmura. During the same period the Command conducted a number of attacks on targets in Manchuria, China and Formosa from its bases in China, as well as striking targets in Southeast Asia from India. The command flew its final mission from India, a raid on Singapore, on 29 March; its constituent units were then transferred to the Mariana Islands.

Overall, Operation Matterhorn was not successful. The nine raids conducted against Japan via bases in China succeeded only in destroying Ōmura's aircraft factory. XX Bomber Command lost 125 B-29s during all of its operations from bases in India and China, though only 22 or 29 were destroyed by Japanese forces; the majority of the losses were due to flying accidents. The attacks had a limited impact on Japanese civilian morale but forced the Japanese military to reinforce the home islands' air defenses at the expense of other areas. These results did not justify the large allocation of Allied resources to the operation, however. Moreover, the diversion of some supply aircraft flown between India and China to support XX Bomber Command's efforts may have prevented the Fourteenth Air Force from undertaking more effective operations against Japanese positions and shipping. The official history of the USAAF judged that the difficulty of transporting adequate supplies to India and China was the most important factor behind the failure of Operation Matterhorn, though technical problems with the B-29s and the inexperience of their crews also hindered the campaign. The adverse weather conditions common over Japan also limited the effectiveness of the Superfortresses, as crews that managed to reach their target were often unable to bomb accurately due to high winds or cloud cover.

=== Proposed Soviet-American cooperation ===
In 1944, the bombing of Japan from the Soviet Union by American aircraft with American or Soviet crews was considered. Following a request from Roosevelt at the Tehran Conference, Stalin agreed on 2 February 1944 that the United States could operate 1,000 bombers from Siberia after the Soviet Union had declared war on Japan.

In spring 1944, the Soviets asked for assistance in creating a long-range bombing force for Japan, with 300 (lend-lease) B-24s and 240 B-29s. In negotiations in July and August, the United States agreed to supply 200 B-24s (50 per month; probably via Abadan) and to train operational and maintenance crews. But with difficulties over the arrangements, the USSR announced on 29 September that they would forego American training in view of the uncertainty over the B-24s.

Stalin had agreed at the 1944 Moscow Conference to the United States having air bases near Vladivostok (where six or seven large aerodromes had been built and reserved) and the use of Petropavlovsk (Kamchatka) as a base; he "virtually ignored" earlier proposals for a Soviet bombing force. However, despite an American team going to Moscow in December 1944 they failed to reach agreement. On 16 December 1944 General Antonov said that Soviet forces would need all their naval and air bases in the Maritime Provinces' and American B-29s would have to be based far to the north of Vladivostok near the mouth of the Amur River in the Komsomolsk-Nikolaevsk area. It was decided to press for this at Yalta. At the Yalta Conference one year later, Stalin told Roosevelt that American B-29s would be based at the remote Komsomolsk-Nikolaevsk area. Antonov said that they would start preliminary base construction. However, the proposal subsequently lapsed.

== Initial attacks from the Mariana Islands ==
During the Mariana Islands campaign, US forces captured Japanese-held islands in the Battles of Guam, Saipan and Tinian between June and August 1944. USAAF and US Navy engineers subsequently constructed six airfields on the islands to accommodate hundreds of B-29s. These bases were more capable of supporting an intensive air campaign against Japan than those in China as they could be easily supplied by sea and were 1,500 miles (2,400 km) south of Tokyo, which allowed B-29s to strike most areas in the home islands and return without refueling. Japanese aircraft made several attacks on the airfield at Saipan while it was under construction.

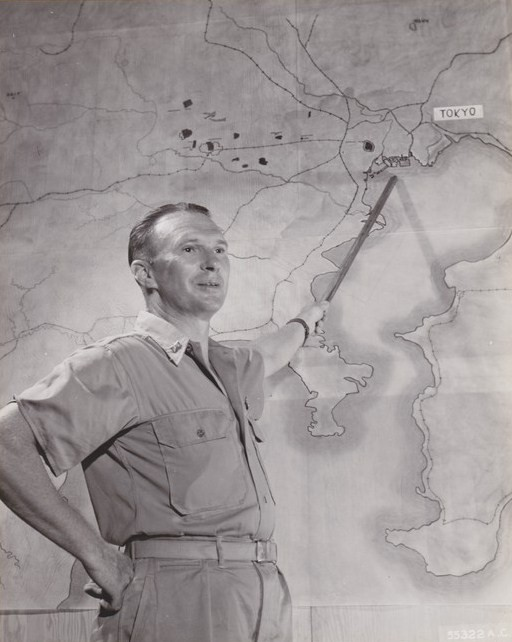
Brigadier General Haywood S. Hansell posing with a map of the Tokyo region in November 1944

The Twentieth Air Force's XXI Bomber Command began arriving in the Mariana Islands during October 1944. The Command was led by Brigadier General Haywood S. Hansell, who had also participated in Eighth Air Force operations against Germany. XXI Bomber Command B-29s flew six practice missions against targets in the Central Pacific during October and November in preparation for their first attack on Japan. On 1 November, a 3rd Photographic Reconnaissance Squadron F-13 photo reconnaissance variant of the B-29 overflew Tokyo; this was the first American aircraft to fly over the city since the Doolittle Raid. Further F-13 sorties in early November gathered intelligence on aircraft factories and port facilities in the Tokyo–Yokosuka area. The F-13s were generally able to evade the heavy anti-aircraft fire they attracted and the large numbers of Japanese fighters that were scrambled to intercept them as they flew at both high speed and high altitude.

XXI Bomber Command's initial attacks against Japan were focused on the country's aircraft industry. The first attack, codenamed Operation San Antonio I, was made against the Musashino aircraft plant in the outskirts of Tokyo on 24 November 1944. Only 24 of the 111 B-29s dispatched attacked the primary target, and the others bombed port facilities as well as industrial and urban areas. The Americans were intercepted by 125 Japanese fighters but only one B-29 was shot down. This attack caused some damage to the aircraft plant and further reduced Japanese civilians' confidence in the country's air defenses. In response, the IJAAF and IJN stepped up their air attacks on B-29 bases in the Mariana Islands from 27 November; these raids continued until January 1945 and resulted in the destruction of eleven Superfortresses and damage to another 43 for the loss of probably 37 Japanese aircraft. The IJA also began launching Fu-Go balloon bombs against the United States during November. This campaign caused little damage and was abandoned in March 1945. By this time 9,000 balloons had been dispatched but only 285 were reported to have reached the contiguous United States.

The next American raids on Japan were not successful. XXI Bomber Command attacked Tokyo three times between 27 November and 3 December; two of these raids were made against the Musashino aircraft plant while the other targeted an industrial area using M-69 incendiary cluster bombs, specifically developed to damage Japanese urban areas. The aircraft plant was attacked on 27 November and 3 December and was only lightly damaged as high winds and clouds prevented accurate bombing. The incendiary raid conducted on the night of 29 and 30 November by twenty-nine Superfortresses burnt out one-tenth of a square mile, and was also judged to be unsuccessful by the Twentieth Air Force's headquarters.

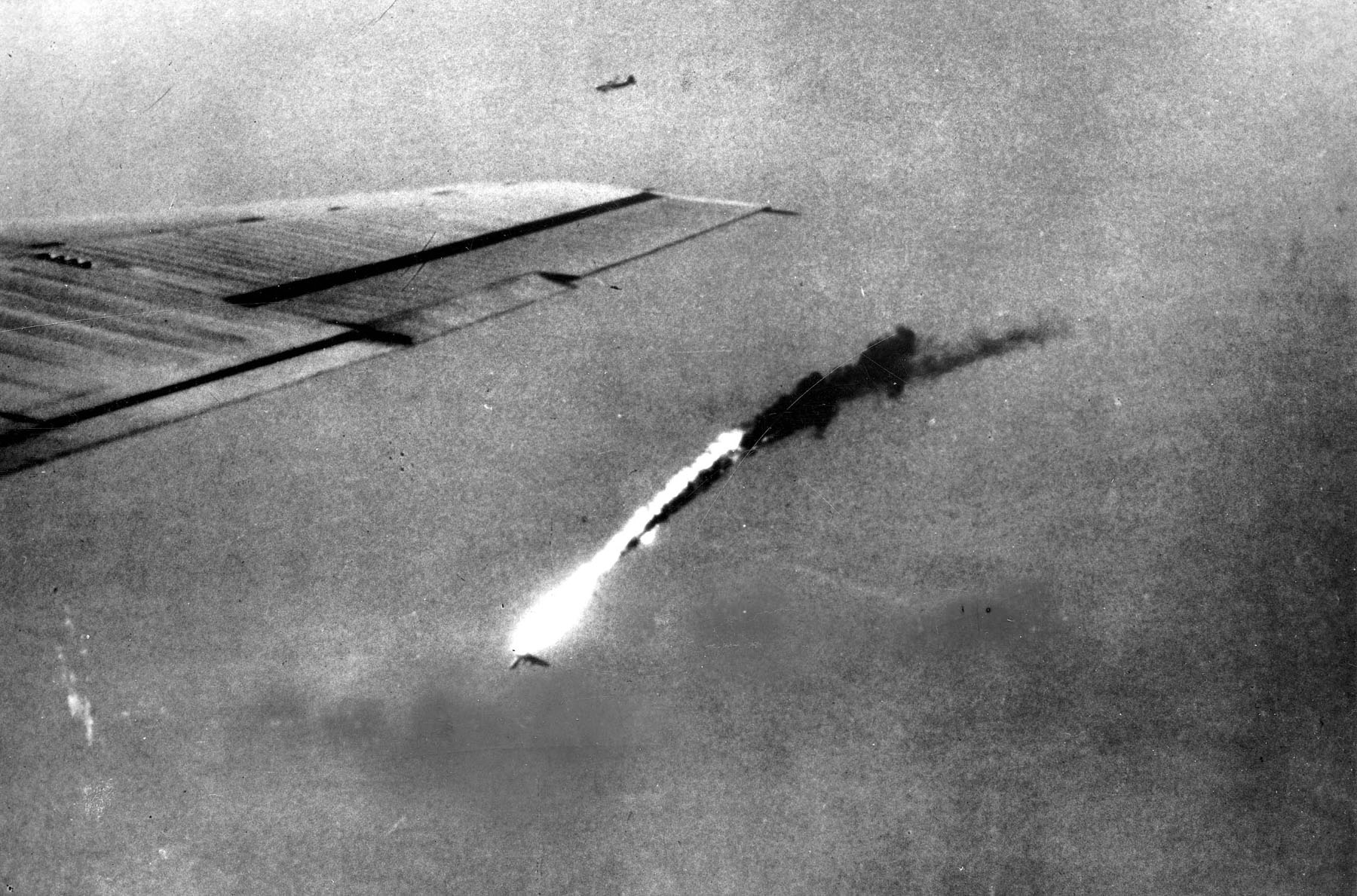
A B-29 falls in flames after a direct hit by an anti-aircraft shell over Japan

Four of XXI Bomber Command's next five raids were made against targets in Nagoya. The first two of these attacks on 13 and 18 December used precision bombing tactics, and damaged the city's aircraft plants. The third raid was a daylight incendiary attack which was conducted after the Twentieth Air Force directed that 100 B-29s armed with M-69 bombs be dispatched against Nagoya to test the effectiveness of these weapons on a Japanese city. Hansell protested this order, as he believed that precision attacks were starting to produce results and moving to area bombardment would be counterproductive, but agreed to the operation after he was assured that it did not represent a general shift in tactics. Despite the change in armament, the 22 December raid was planned as a precision attack on an aircraft factory using only 78 bombers, and bad weather meant that little damage was caused. XXI Bomber Command raided the Musashino aircraft plant in Tokyo again on 27 December, but did not damage the facility. On 3 January 1945, 97 B-29s were dispatched to conduct an area bombing raid on Nagoya. This attack started several fires, but these were quickly brought under control.

Arnold was disappointed with what XXI Bomber Command had achieved, and wanted the Command to produce results quickly. In addition, Hansell's preference for precision bombing was no longer in accordance with the views of the Twentieth Air Force headquarters, which wanted a greater emphasis on area attacks. In late December 1944 Arnold decided to relieve Hansell of his command. Seeing LeMay's success in improving XX Bomber Command's performance, Arnold thought LeMay could solve the problems at XXI Bomber Command, and replaced Hansell with him. Hansell was informed of Arnold's decision on 6 January, but remained in his position until mid-January. During this period, XXI Bomber Command conducted unsuccessful precision bombing attacks on the Musashino aircraft plant in Tokyo and a Mitsubishi Aircraft Works factory in Nagoya on 9 and 14 January respectively. The last attack planned by Hansell was more successful, however: a force of 77 B-29s crippled a Kawasaki Aircraft Industries factory near Akashi on 19 January. During XXI Bomber Command's first three months of operations, it lost an average of 4.1 percent of aircraft dispatched in each raid.

In late January 1945 the Imperial General Headquarters belatedly adopted a civil defense plan to counter the American air raids. This plan assigned responsibility for fighting fires to community councils and neighborhood groups as the professional firefighting units were short-handed. Civilians were to observe a blackout from 10:00 pm. Japanese positions in the Bonin Islands were normally able to provide an hour's warning of American raids and air raid sirens were sounded in cities threatened by attack.

The first attacks conducted under LeMay's leadership achieved mixed results. XXI Bomber Command flew six major missions between 23 January and 19 February with little success, though an incendiary raid against Kobe on 4 February caused significant damage to the city and its main factories. Moreover, while improved maintenance procedures implemented by LeMay reduced the number of B-29s that had to return to base during raids due to technical problems, the Command suffered a loss rate of 5.1 percent in these operations. From 19 February to 3 March, XXI Bomber Command conducted a series of precision bombing raids on aircraft factories that sought to tie down Japanese air units so they could not participate in the Battle of Iwo Jima. However, these attacks were frustrated by high winds and cloud cover and little damage was inflicted. A firebombing raid conducted against Tokyo by 172 B-29s on 25 February was considered successful as it burnt or damaged approximately one square mile of the city's urban area. This attack was a large-scale test of the effectiveness of firebombing.

Several factors explain the poor results of XXI Bomber Command's precision bombing campaign. The most important of these was the weather; the American raiders frequently encountered cloudy conditions and high winds over Japan which made accurate bombing extremely difficult. Moreover, the bomber forces often had to pass through severe weather fronts between the Mariana Islands and Japan, which broke up formations and caused navigation problems. XXI Bomber Command's effectiveness was also limited by poor B-29 maintenance practices and over-crowding at its airfields—these factors reduced the number of aircraft which were available for operations and complicated the process of launching and recovering the bombers. By March 1945 the USAAF's commanders were highly concerned about the failure of the campaigns mounted from China and the Mariana Islands, and believed that the results to date made it difficult to justify the high costs of the B-29 program and also threatened their goal of demonstrating the effectiveness of independent air power.

== Firebombing attacks ==
=== LeMay changes tactics ===
In 1943, USAAF planners began assessing the feasibility of a firebombing campaign against Japanese cities. Japan's main industrial facilities were vulnerable to such attacks as they were concentrated in several large cities and a high proportion of production took place in homes and small factories in urban areas. The planners estimated that incendiary bomb attacks on Japan's six largest cities could cause physical damage to almost 40 percent of industrial facilities and result in the loss of 7.6 million man-months of labor. It was also estimated that these attacks would kill over 500,000 people, render about 7.75 million homeless and force almost 3.5 million to be evacuated. The USAAF tested the effectiveness of incendiary bombs on Japanese-style buildings at Eglin Field and the " Japanese Village” at Dugway Proving Ground. The American military also attempted to develop "bat bombs," using incendiary bombs attached to bats dropped by aircraft to attack Japanese cities, but this project was abandoned in 1944. During early 1945 the USAAF conducted raids against cities in Formosa to trial tactics which could be later used against Japanese urban areas.

Napalm, used by the Americans for flamethrowers and incendiary bombs, was increased in production from 500,000 lb (230,000 kg) in 1943 to 8 million lb (3.6 million kg) in 1944. Much of the napalm went from nine US factories to bomb-assembly plants making the M-69 incendiary and packing 38 of them into the E-46 cluster bomb; these were shipped across the Pacific and stored for future use. Arnold and the Air Staff wanted to wait to use the incendiaries until a large-scale program of firebombing could be mounted, to overwhelm the Japanese city defenses.

In light of the poor results of the precision bombing campaign and the success of the 25 February raid on Tokyo, and considering that many tons of incendiaries were now available to him, LeMay decided to begin firebombing attacks on Japan's main cities during early March 1945. This was in line with Arnold's targeting directive for XXI Bomber Command, which specified that urban areas were to be accorded the second-highest priority for attacks after aircraft factories. The directive also stated that firebombing raids should be conducted once M-69 bombs had been tested in combat and the number of B-29s available was sufficient to launch an intensive campaign. LeMay did not seek Arnold's specific approval before launching his firebombing campaign, however, to protect the USAAF commander from criticism if the attacks were unsuccessful. The Twentieth Air Force's Chief of Staff, Brigadier General Lauris Norstad, was aware of the change in tactics though and provided support. The decision to use firebombing tactics represented a move away from the USAAF's previous focus on precision bombing, and was believed by senior officials in the military and U.S. Government to be justified by the need to rapidly bring the war to an end.

To maximize the effectiveness of the firebombing attacks, LeMay ordered the B-29s to fly at the low altitude of 5,000 feet (1,500 m) and bomb by night; this represented a significant change from the Command's standard tactics, which focused on high-altitude daylight bombing. As Japan's night fighter force was weak and the anti-aircraft batteries were less effective at night, LeMay also had most of the B-29s' defensive guns removed; by reducing the weight of the aircraft in this way they were able to carry more bombs. These changes were not popular with XXI Bomber Command's aircrew, as they believed that it was safer to fly heavily armed aircraft at high altitude.

=== March firebombing campaign ===
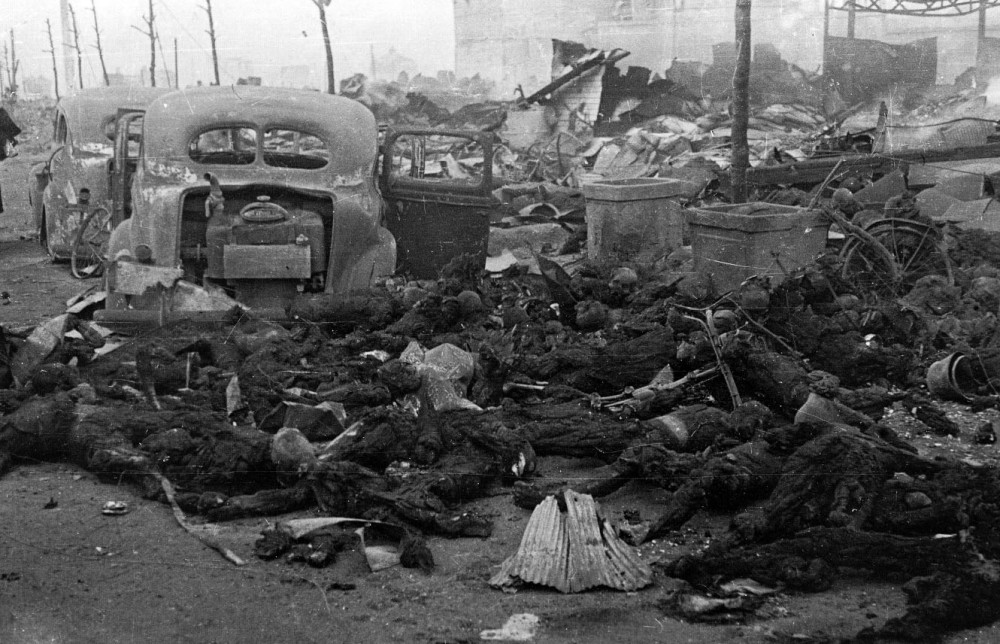
The partially incinerated remains of Japanese civilians in Tokyo, 10 March 1945

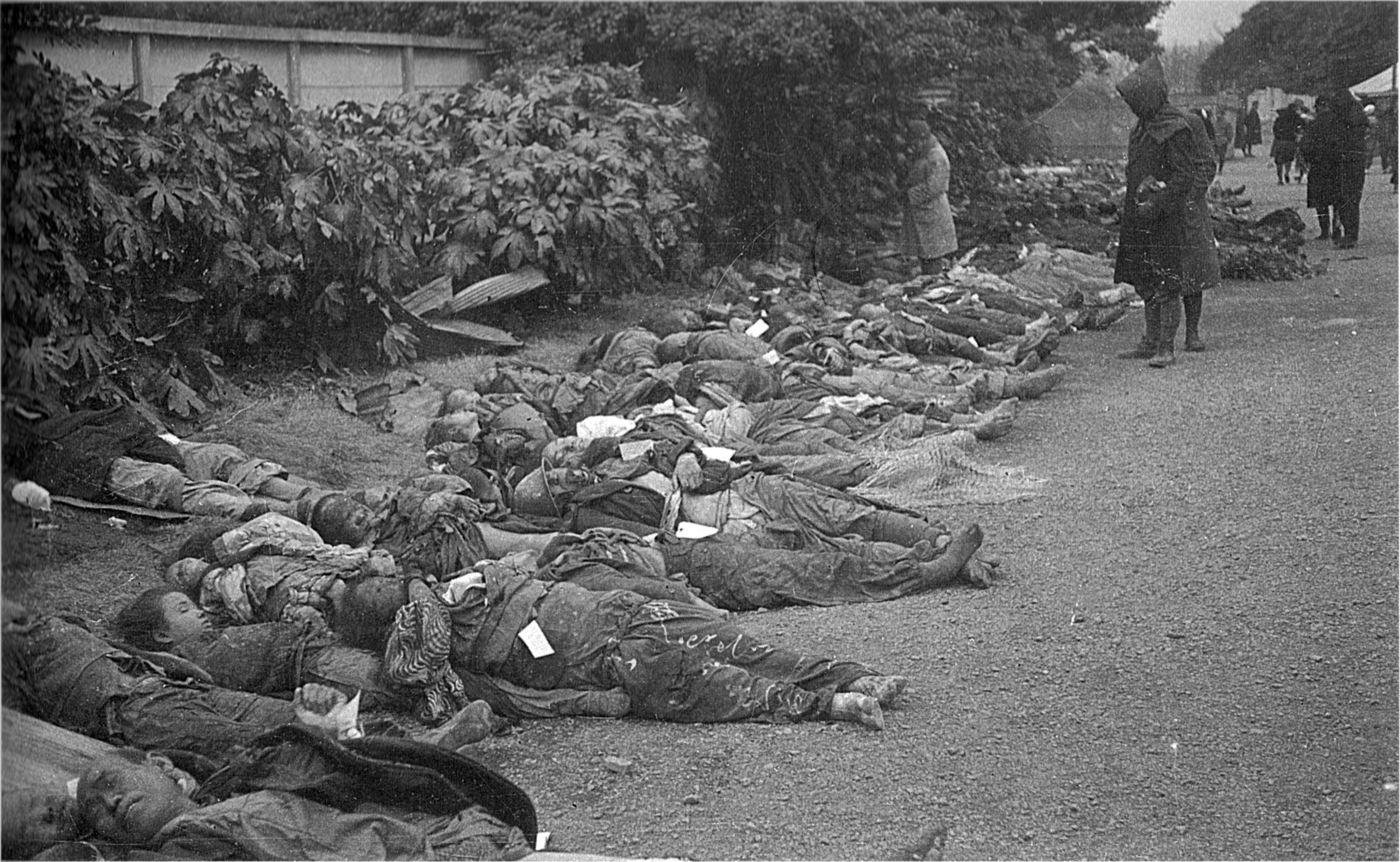
Bodies of people killed in Operation Meetinghouse laid out in Ueno Park, Tokyo, 16 March 1945

The first firebombing attack in this campaign—codenamed Operation Meetinghouse—was carried out against Tokyo on the night of 9 and 10 March, and proved to be the single most destructive air raid of the war. XXI Bomber Command mounted a maximum effort, and on the afternoon of 9 March 346 B-29s left the Marianas bound for Tokyo. They began to arrive over the city at 2:00 am Guam time on 10 March, and 279 bombers dropped 1,665 tons of bombs. The raid caused a massive conflagration that overwhelmed Tokyo's civil defenses and destroyed 16 square miles (41 km^{2}) of buildings, representing seven percent of the city's urban area. The Tokyo police force and fire department estimated that 83,793 people were killed during the air raid, another 40,918 were injured and just over 1 million lost their homes; postwar estimates of deaths in this attack have ranged from 80,000 to 100,000. Damage to Tokyo's war production was also substantial. Japanese opposition to this attack was relatively weak; fourteen B-29s were destroyed as a result of combat or mechanical faults and a further 42 damaged by anti-aircraft fire. Following the attack on Tokyo, the Japanese government ordered the evacuation of all schoolchildren in the third to sixth grades from the main cities, and 87 percent of them had departed to the countryside by early April.

XXI Bomber Command followed up the firebombing of Tokyo with similar raids against other major cities. On 11 March 310 B-29s were dispatched against Nagoya. The bombing was spread over a greater area than had been the case at Tokyo, and the attack caused less damage. Nevertheless, 2.05 square miles (5.3 km^{2}) of buildings were burnt out and no B-29s were lost to the Japanese defenses. On the night of 13 and 14 March, 274 Superfortresses attacked Osaka and destroyed 8.1 square miles (21 km^{2}) of the city for the loss of two aircraft. Kobe was the next target in the firebombing campaign, and was attacked by 331 B-29s on the night of 16 and 17 March. The resulting firestorm destroyed 7 square miles (18 km^{2}) of the city (equivalent to half its area), killed 8,000 people and rendered 650,000 people homeless. Three B-29s were lost. Nagoya was attacked again on the night of 18 and 19 March, and the B-29s destroyed 2.95 square miles (7.6 km^{2}) of buildings. Only one Superfortress was shot down during this attack, and all members of its crew were rescued after the aircraft ditched into the sea. This raid marked the end of the first firebombing campaign as XXI Bomber Command had exhausted its supplies of incendiary bombs. The Command's next major operation was an unsuccessful night precision attack on the Mitsubishi aircraft engine factory conducted on the night of 23 and 24 March; during this operation five of the 251 aircraft dispatched were shot down. B-29s also began to drop propaganda leaflets over Japan during March. These leaflets called on Japanese civilians to overthrow their government or face destruction.

The USAAF assessed that the firebombing campaign had been highly successful, and noted that American losses during these attacks were much lower than those incurred during day precision raids. Accordingly, the Joint Target Group (JTG), which was the Washington, DC−based organization responsible for developing strategies for the air campaign against Japan, developed plans for a two-stage campaign against 22 Japanese cities. The JTG also recommended that precision bombing attacks on particularly important industrial facilities continue in parallel to the area raids, however. While this campaign was intended to form part of preparations for the Allied invasion of Japan, LeMay and some members of Arnold's staff believed that it alone would be sufficient to force the country's surrender.

The Japanese government was concerned about the results of the March firebombing attacks as the raids had demonstrated that the Japanese military was unable to protect the nation's airspace. As well as the extensive physical damage in the targeted cities, the attacks also caused increased absenteeism as civilians were afraid to leave their homes to work in factories which might be bombed. Japanese air defenses were reinforced in response to the firebombing raids, but remained inadequate; 450 fighters were assigned to defensive duties in April.

=== Destruction of Japan's main cities ===
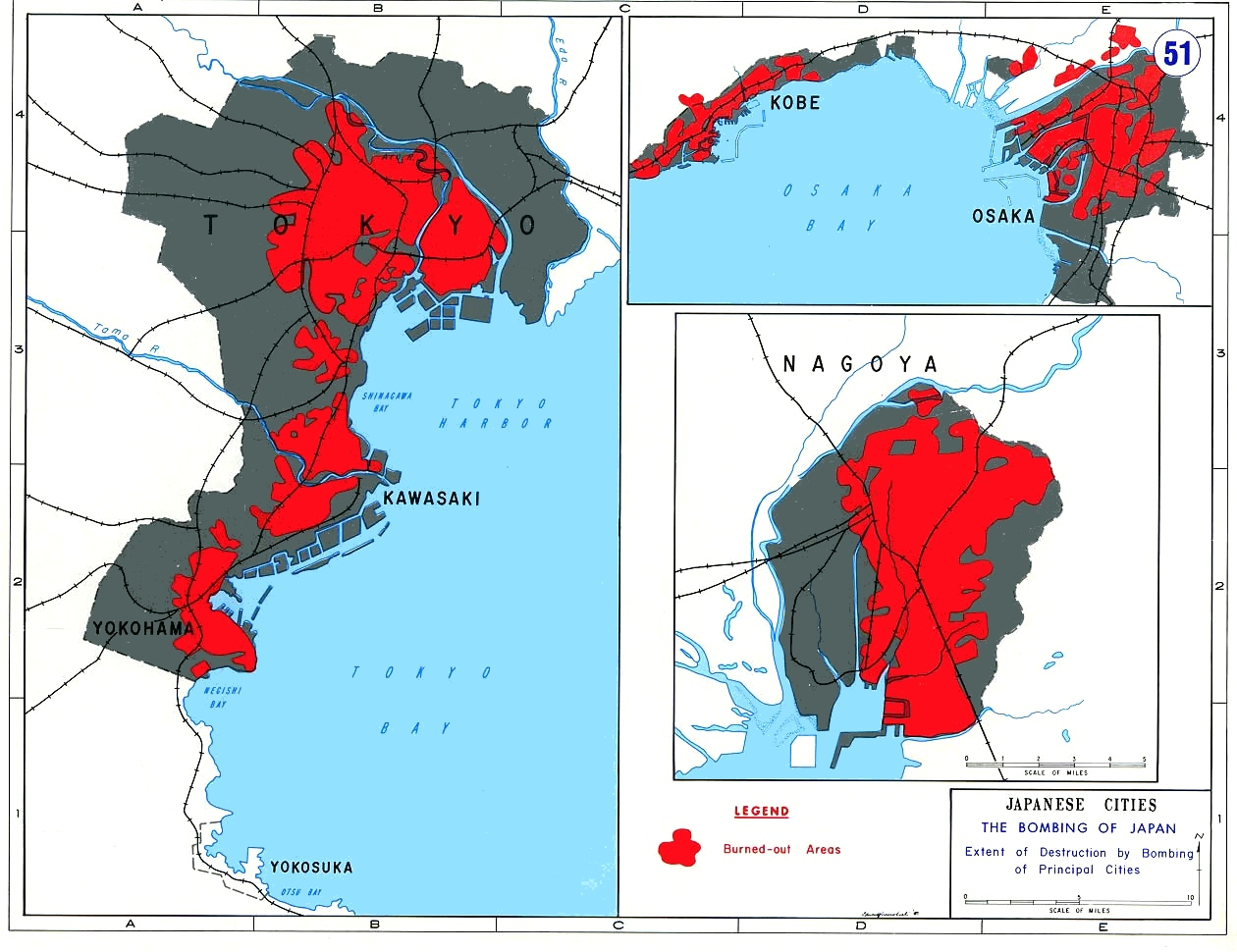
The areas of Japan's main cities which were destroyed in air attacks during the war

The start of the major firebombing campaign was delayed as XXI Bomber Command was used to attack airfields in southern Japan from late March to mid-May in support of the invasion of Okinawa, an island only a few hundred miles south of the home islands. Prior to the landings on 1 April, the XXI Bomber Command bombed airfields in Kyushu at Ōita and Tachiarai as well as an aircraft plant at Ōmura on 27 March, and struck Ōita and Tachiarai again on August 31. No B-29s were lost in these raids. From 6 April the Japanese conducted large-scale kamikaze air raids on the Allied invasion fleet, during which suicide aircraft damaged or sank many warships and transports. As part of the Allied response to these attacks, XXI Bomber Command conducted major raids on airfields in Kyushu on 8 and 16 April, though the first of these attacks was diverted to strike residential areas in Kagoshima after the airfields were found to be covered by clouds. From 17 April until 11 May, when the B-29s were released for other duties, about three-quarters of XXI Bomber Command's effort was devoted to attacking airfields and other targets in direct support of the Battle of Okinawa; this included 2,104 sorties flown against 17 airfields. These raids cost the Command 24 B-29s destroyed and 233 damaged and failed to completely suppress kamikaze attacks from the targeted airfields.

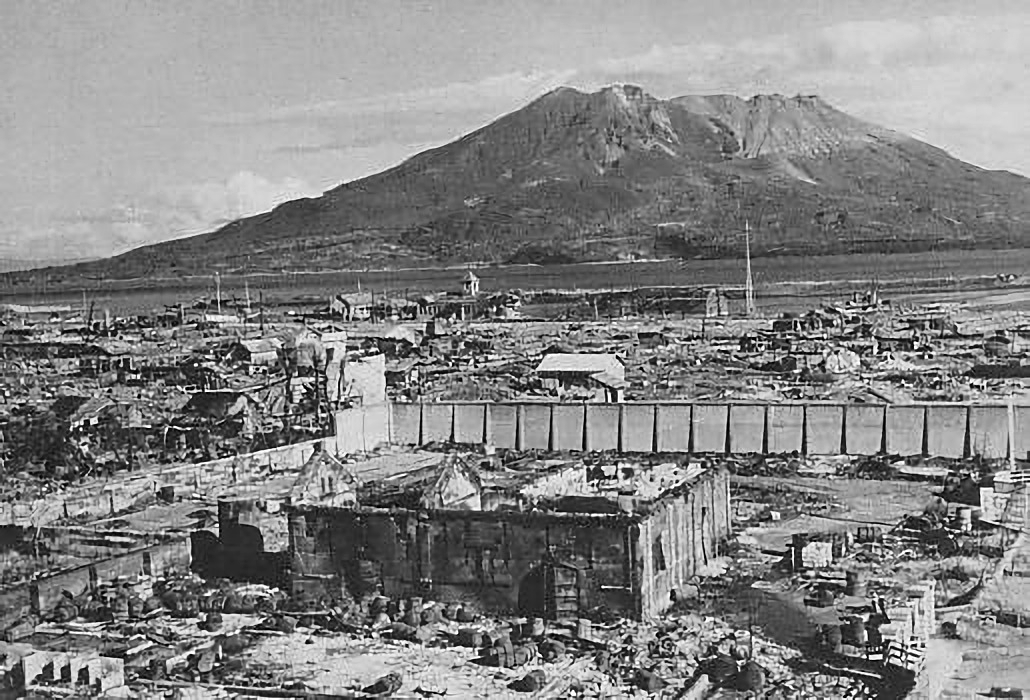
The ruins of a Kagoshima residential area with Sakurajima in the background, 1 November 1945

A few attacks on Japanese cities were conducted during the Battle of Okinawa. On 1 April, a night precision bombing raid was flown against the Nakajima engine factory in Tokyo by 121 B-29s and three similar attacks were conducted against engine factories in Shizuoka, Koizumi and Tachikawa on the night of 3 April. These raids were unsuccessful as XXI Bomber Command lacked the specialized equipment needed to strike targets accurately at night, and LeMay decided not to conduct similar operations. Small forces of B-29s also struck Tokyo and nearby Kawasaki on 4 April. Two successful large-scale precision bombing raids were flown against aircraft factories in Tokyo and Nagoya on 7 April; the raid on Tokyo was the first to be escorted by Iwo Jima-based P-51 Mustang very-long-range fighters from the VII Fighter Command, and the Americans claimed to have shot down 101 Japanese aircraft for the loss of two P-51s and seven B-29s. Over 250 B-29s struck 3 different aircraft factories on 12 April; during this operation the 73rd Bombardment Wing inflicted heavy damage on the Musashino aircraft plant and fought off 185 Japanese fighters without loss.

LeMay resumed night firebombing raids on 13 April when 327 B-29s attacked the arsenal district of Tokyo and destroyed 11.4 square miles (30 km^{2}) of the city, including several armaments factories. On 15 April 303 Superfortresses attacked the Tokyo region and destroyed 6 square miles (16 km^{2}) of Tokyo, 3.6 square miles (9.3 km^{2}) of Kawasaki and 1.5 square miles (3.9 km^{2}) of Yokohama for the loss of twelve bombers. On 24 April the Tachikawa aircraft engine factory at Yamato near Tokyo was destroyed by 131 B-29s. An attack on the aircraft arsenal at Tachikawa six days later was aborted due to cloud cover; some of the heavy bombers attacked the city of Hamamatsu instead. Another precision raid was made against the Hiro Naval Aircraft Factory at Kure on 5 May when 148 B-29s inflicted heavy damage on the facility. Five days later B-29s successfully attacked oil storage facilities at Iwakuni, Ōshima and Toyama. On 11 May a small force of B-29s destroyed an airframe factory at Konan. XXI Bomber Command reached its full strength in April when the 58th and 315th Bombardment Wings arrived in the Marianas; at this time the command comprised five wings equipped with a total of 1,002 B-29s and was the most powerful air unit in the world.

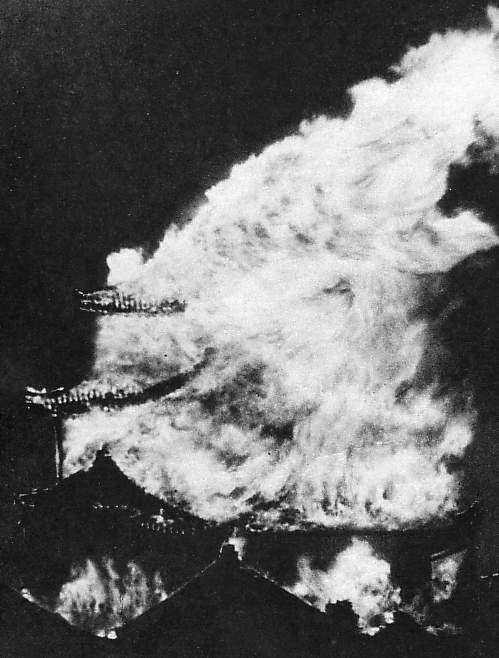
Nagoya Castle burning after an air raid, 14 May 1945

After being released from supporting the Okinawa campaign, XXI Bomber Command conducted an intensive firebombing campaign against Japan's main cities from mid-May. A force of 472 B-29s struck Nagoya by day on 13 May and destroyed 3.15 square miles (8.2 km^{2}) of the city. The Japanese mounted a strong defense that downed two Superfortresses and damaged another 64; another eight B-29s were lost to other causes. The Americans claimed 18 Japanese fighter "kills" as well as another 30 "probables" and sixteen damaged. Nagoya was attacked again by 457 B-29s on the night of 16 May, and the resulting fires destroyed 3.82 square miles (9.9 km^{2}) of the city. Japanese defenses were much weaker by night, and the three bombers lost in this attack crashed due to mechanical problems. The two raids on Nagoya killed 3,866 Japanese and rendered another 472,701 homeless. On 19 May 318 B-29s conducted an unsuccessful precision bombing raid on the Tachikawa Aircraft Company. XXI Bomber Command made further large-scale firebombing attacks against Tokyo on the nights of 23 and 25 May. In the first of these raids 520 B-29s destroyed 5.3 square miles (14 km^{2}) of southern Tokyo with 17 aircraft lost and 69 damaged. The second attack involved 502 B-29s and destroyed 16.8 square miles (44 km^{2}) of the city's central area, including the headquarters of several key government ministries and much of the Tokyo Imperial Palace; the bomber crews had been briefed to not target the palace as the US Government did not want to risk killing Emperor Hirohito. The Japanese defenses were relatively successful on this occasion, and 26 Superfortresses were shot down and another 100 damaged.

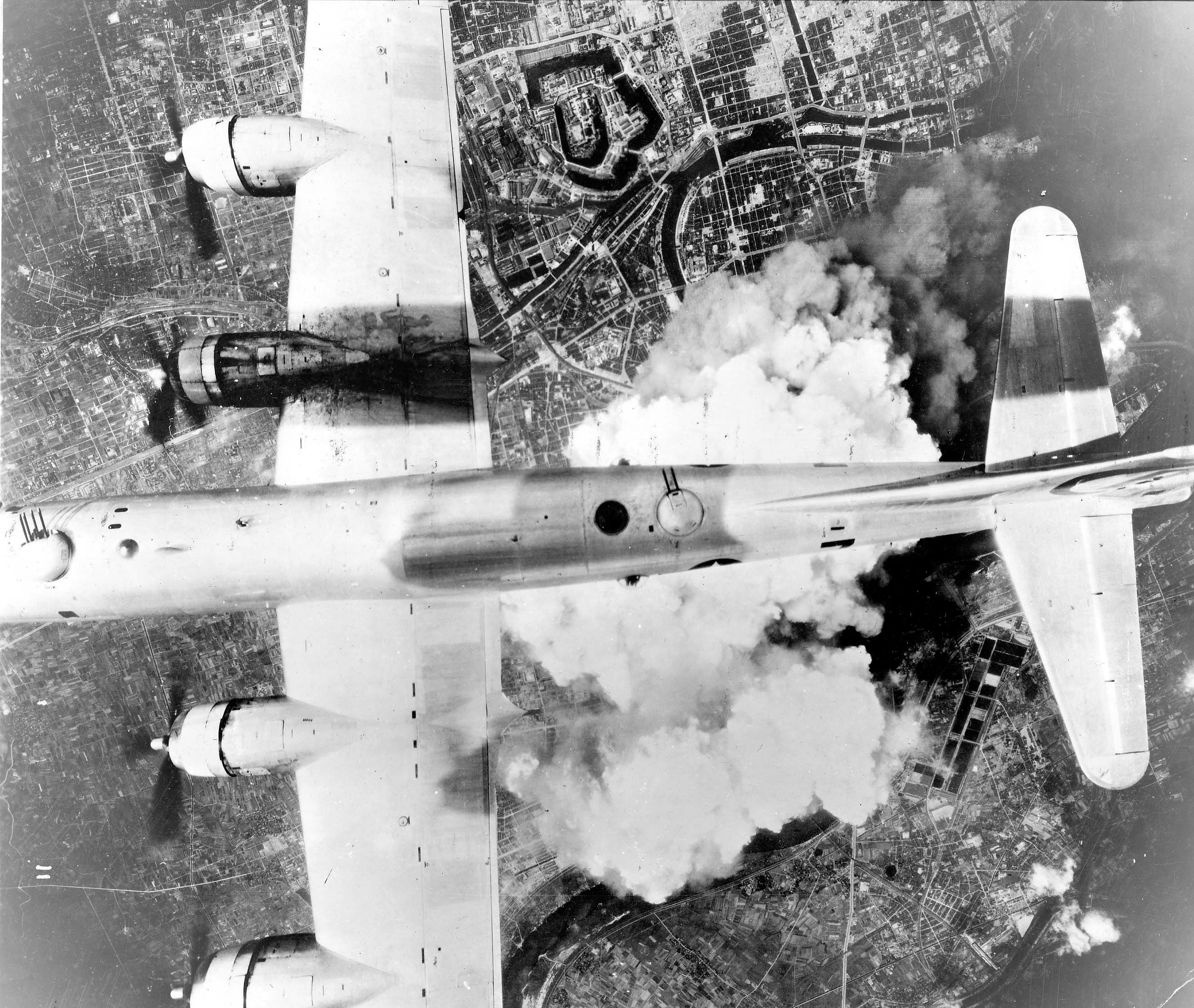
A B-29 over Osaka on 1 June 1945

By the end of these raids just over half (50.8 percent) of Tokyo had been destroyed and the city was removed from XXI Bomber Command's target list. The XXI Bomber Command's last major raid of May was a daylight incendiary attack on Yokohama on 29 May conducted by 517 B-29s escorted by 101 P-51s. This force was intercepted by 150 A6M Zero fighters, sparking an intense air battle in which five B-29s were shot down and another 175 damaged. In return, the P-51 pilots claimed twenty-six "kills" and twenty-three "probables" for the loss of three fighters. The 454 B-29s that reached Yokohama struck the city's main business district and destroyed 6.9 square miles (18 km^{2}) of buildings; over 1,000 Japanese were killed. Overall, the attacks in May destroyed 94 square miles (240 km^{2}) of buildings, which was equivalent to one seventh of Japan's total urban area. The Minister of Home Affairs, Iwao Yamazaki, concluded after these raids that Japan's civil defense arrangements were "considered to be futile."

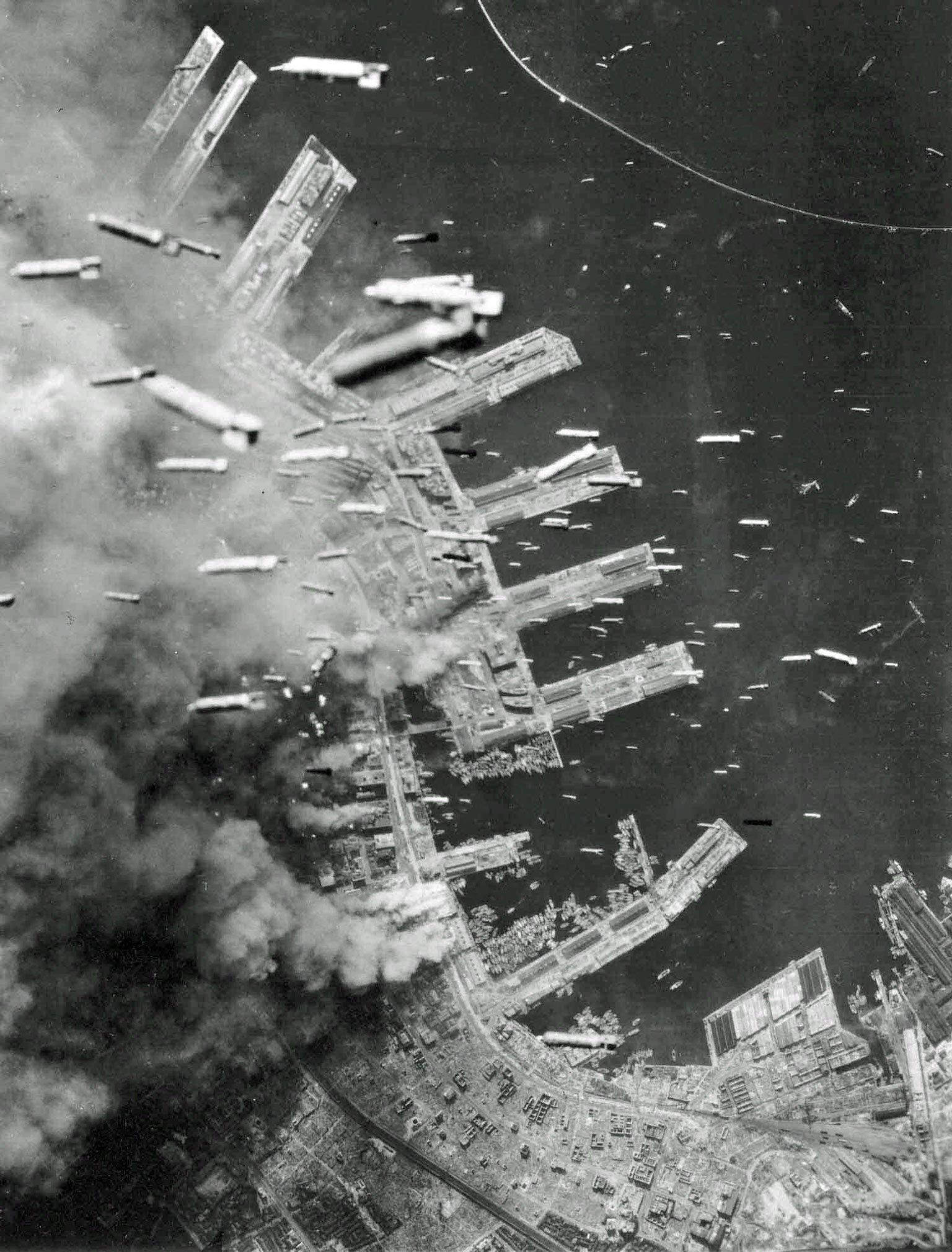
Incendiary bombs being dropped on Kobe, 4 June 1945

The firebombing campaign against major cities ended in June. On the first day of June, 521 B-29s escorted by 148 P-51s were dispatched in a daylight raid against Osaka. While en route to the city the Mustangs flew through thick clouds, and twenty-seven of the fighters were destroyed in collisions. Nevertheless, 458 heavy bombers and twenty-seven P-51s reached the city and the bombardment killed 3,960 Japanese and destroyed 3.15 square miles (8.2 km^{2}) of buildings. On 5 June 473 B-29s struck Kobe by day and destroyed 4.35 square miles (11.3 km^{2}) of buildings for the loss of eleven bombers. A force of 409 B-29s attacked Osaka again on 7 June; during this attack 2.21 square miles (5.7 km^{2}) of buildings were burnt out and the Americans did not suffer any losses. Osaka was bombed for the fourth time in the month on 15 June when 444 B-29s destroyed 1.9 square miles (4.9 km^{2}) of the city and another 0.59 square miles (1.5 km^{2}) of nearby Amagasaki; 300,000 houses were destroyed in Osaka. This attack marked the end of the first phase of XXI Bomber Command's attack on Japan's cities. During May and June the bombers had destroyed much of the country's six largest cities, killing between 112,000 and 126,762 people and rendering millions homeless. The widespread destruction and high number of casualties from these raids caused many Japanese to realize that their country's military was no longer able to defend the home islands. American losses were low compared to Japanese casualties; 136 B-29s were downed during the campaign. In Tokyo, Osaka, Nagoya, Yokohama, Kobe and Kawasaki, "over 126,762 people were killed…and a million and a half dwellings and over 105 square miles (270 km^{2}) of urban space were destroyed." In Tokyo, Osaka and Nagoya, "the areas leveled (almost 100 square miles (260 km^{2})) exceeded the areas destroyed in all German cities by both the American and British air forces (approximately 79 square miles (200 km^{2}))."

== Attacks on small cities ==
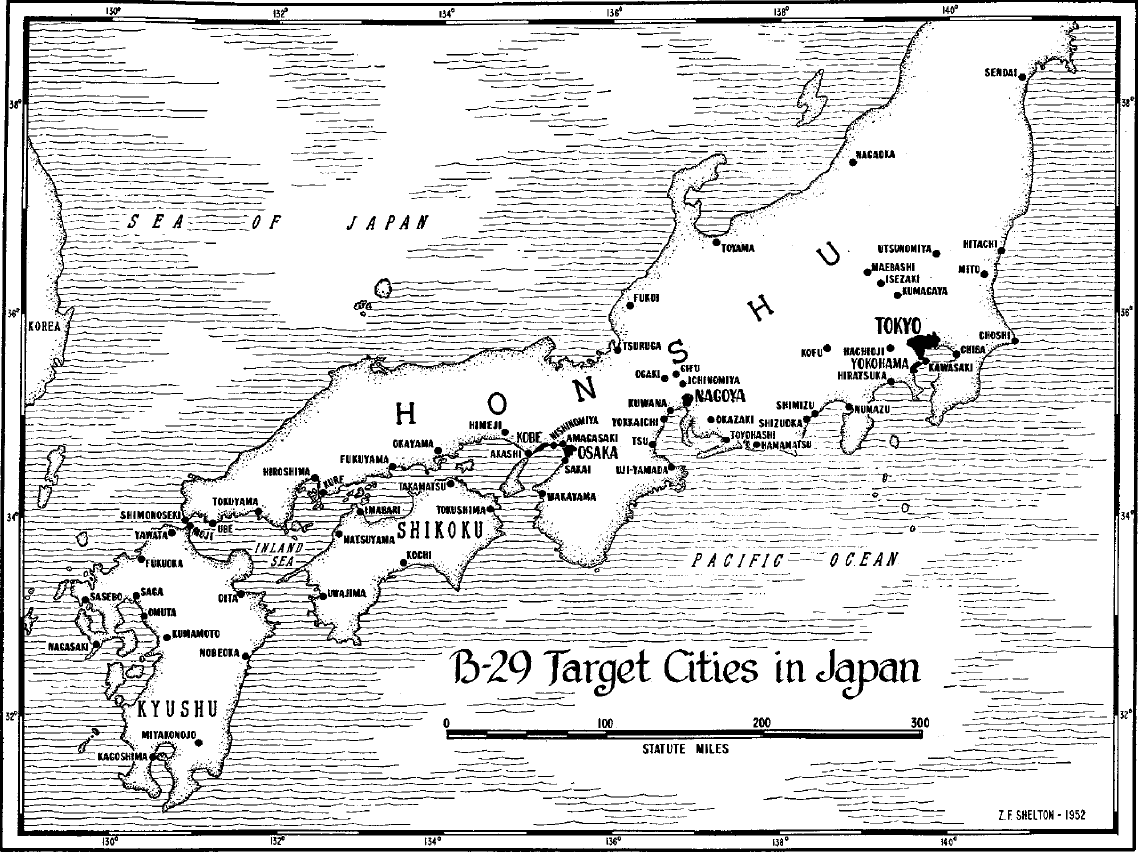
Japanese cities attacked by B-29 bombers during the war

In mid-June Arnold visited LeMay's headquarters at Saipan. During this visit he approved a proposal for XXI Bomber Command to attack twenty-five relatively small cities with populations ranging from 62,280 to 323,000 while also continuing precision raids on major targets. This decision was made despite a recommendation from the United States Strategic Bombing Survey (USSBS) team, which was assessing the effectiveness of air attacks on Germany, that operations against Japan should focus on the country's transportation network and other targets with the goal of crippling the movement of goods and destroying food supplies. LeMay's plan called for precision attacks on important industrial targets on days when the weather over Japan was clear and incendiary attacks guided by radar on overcast days. As both the cities and industrial facilities targeted were relatively small, the B-29 force would be sent against multiple locations on days in which attacks were conducted. This targeting policy, which was labeled the "Empire Plan," remained in force until the last days of the war.

Five major precision bombing attacks were conducted as part of the Empire Plan. On 9 June, two groups of B-29s bombed an aircraft factory at Narao and another two groups raided a factory in Atsuta; both facilities were badly damaged. A single group of Superfortresses also attempted to bomb a Kawasaki Aircraft Industries factory at Akashi but accidentally struck a nearby village instead. The next day, XXI Bomber Command bombers escorted by 107 P-51s successfully attacked 6 different factories in the Tokyo Bay region. Precision bombing raids were also conducted on 22 June, when 382 B-29s attacked six targets at Kure, Kakamigahara, Himeji, Mizushima and Akashi in southern Honshu. Most of the factories targeted were badly damaged. Four days later, 510 B-29s escorted by 148 P-51s were sent against nine factories in southern Honshu and Shikoku. Heavy clouds over the region meant that many bombers attacked targets of opportunity individually or in small groups, and little damage was done to the raid's intended targets. Cloudy weather prevented any further large-scale precision attacks until 24 July, when 625 B-29s were dispatched against seven targets near Nagoya and Osaka. Four of the factories attacked suffered heavy damage. Renewed cloudy weather prevented any further Empire Plan precision attacks in the last weeks of the war.

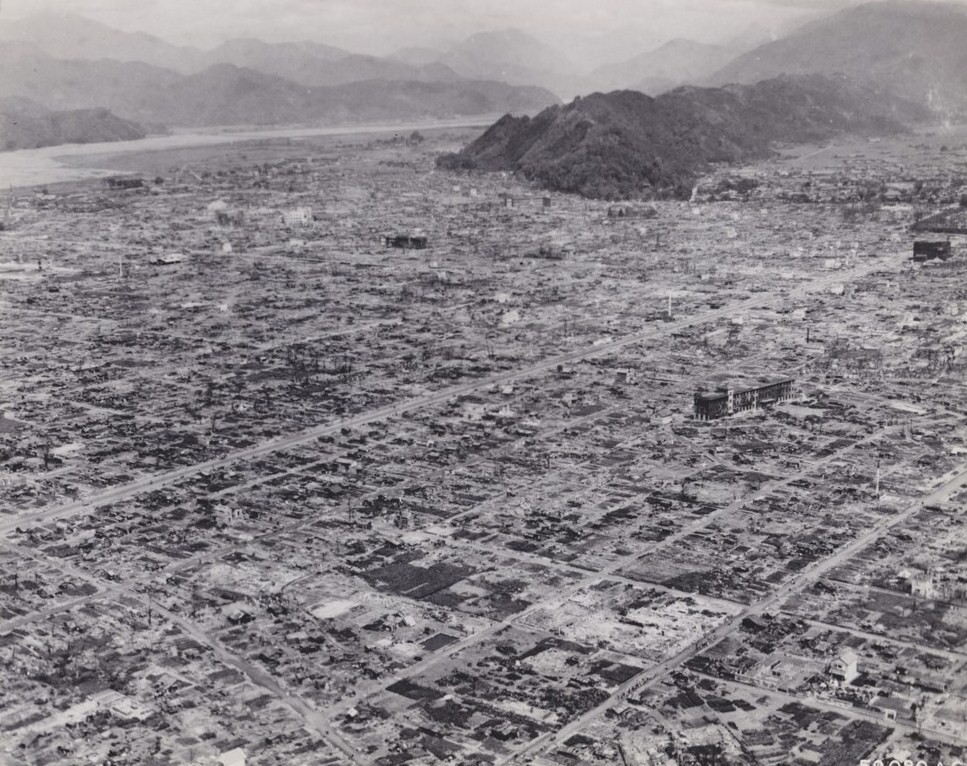
Part of Shizuoka after it was firebombed on 19 June 1945

XXI Bomber Command began incendiary raids against small cities from 17 June. On that night, Hamamatsu, Kagoshima, Ōmuta, Yokkaichi were each attacked by a wing of B-29s using similar tactics to those employed in the firebombing raids against the major cities. Of the 477 B-29s dispatched, 456 struck their targets and Hamamatsu, Kagoshima, Yokkaichi suffered extensive damage; overall 6.07 square miles (15.7 km^{2}) of buildings were destroyed. The cities were almost undefended and no B-29s were lost to Japanese actions. This operation was judged a success, and set the pattern for XXI Bomber Command's firebombing attacks until the end of the war. As the campaign continued and the most important cities were destroyed, the bombers were sent against smaller and less significant cities. On most nights that raids were conducted, four cities were attacked, each by a wing of bombers. Two-wing operations were conducted against Fukuoka on 19 June and Ōmuta on 26 July, however. Sixteen multi-city incendiary attacks had been conducted by the end of the war (an average of two per week), and these targeted 58 cities. The incendiary raids were coordinated with precision bombing attacks during the last weeks of the war in an attempt to force the Japanese government to surrender. As the small cities were not defended by anti-aircraft guns and Japan's night-fighter force was ineffective, only a single B-29 was shot down during this campaign; a further 66 were damaged and 18 crashed as a result of accidents.

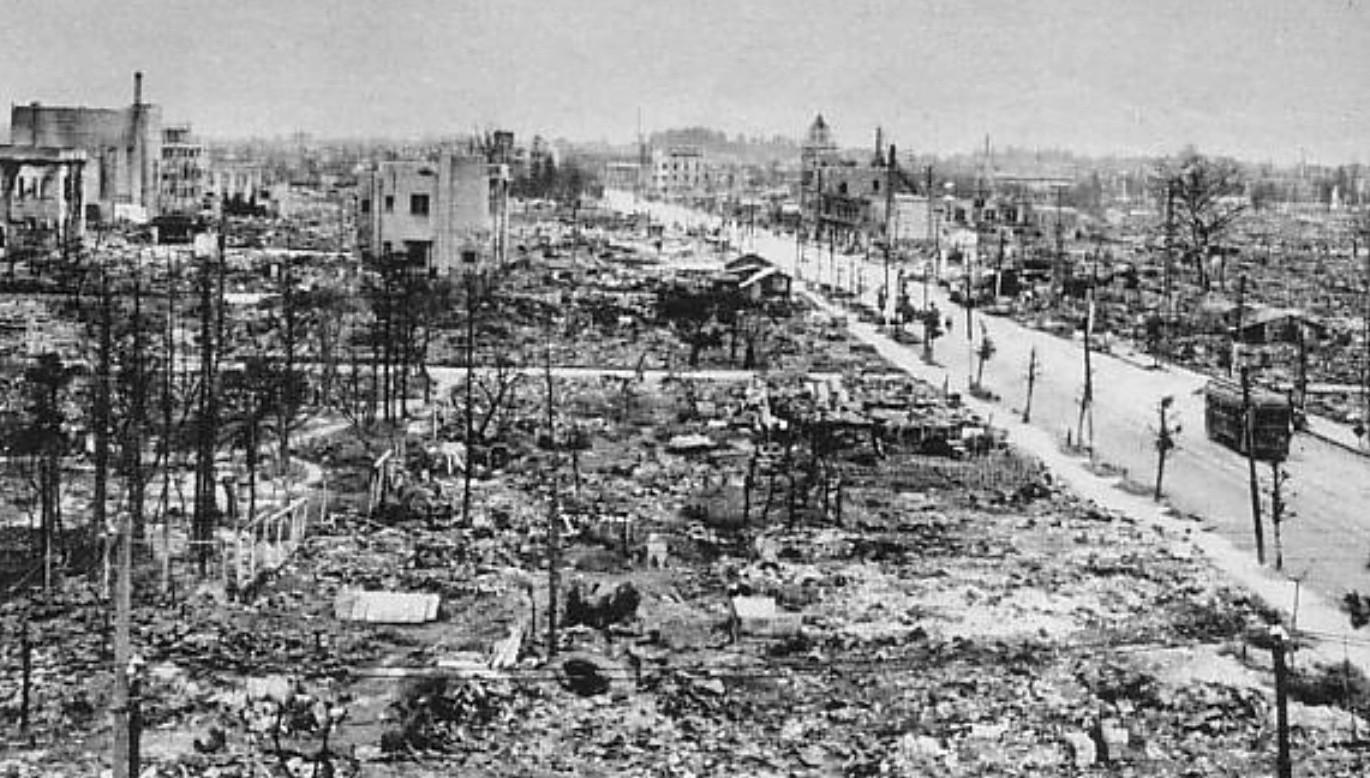
Part of Sendai after the raid on 19 July 1945

The firebombing campaign against small cities continued through June and July. On the night of 19 June B-29s struck Fukuoka, Shizuoka and Toyohashi. On 28 June, the cities of Moji, Nobeoka, Okayama and Sasebo were attacked. Kumamoto, Kure, Shimonoseki and Ube were bombed on 1 July. Two nights later Himeji, Kōchi, Takamatsu and Tokushima were attacked. On 6 July, attacks were conducted against Akashi, Chiba, Kōfu and Shimizu. Gifu, Sakai, Sendai and Wakayama were struck on 9 July. Three nights later the B-29s targeted Ichinomiya, Tsuruga, Utsunomiya and Uwajima. On 16 July, Hiratsuka, Kuwana, Numazu and Ōita were attacked. Chōshi, Fukui, Hitachi, Okazaki were bombed on 19 July. After a break of almost a week, Matsuyama, Omuta and Tokuyama were firebombed on 26 July.

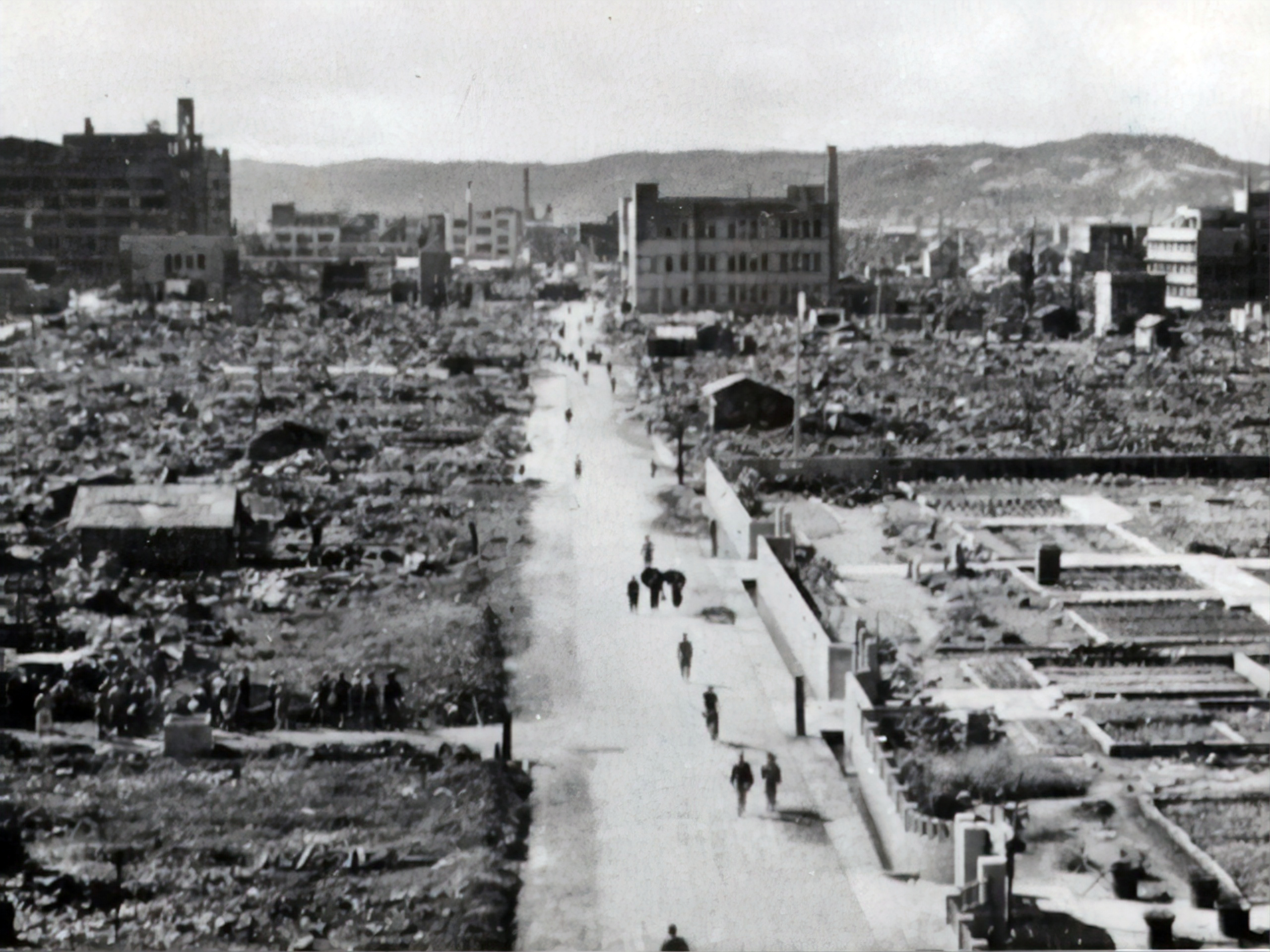
Street view of Okayama in August 1945

XXI Bomber Command also conducted an intensive propaganda campaign alongside its firebombing raids. It has been estimated that B-29s dropped 10 million propaganda leaflets in May, 20 million in June and 30 million in July. The Japanese government implemented harsh penalties against civilians who kept copies of these leaflets. On the night of 27 and 28 July, six B-29s dropped leaflets over eleven Japanese cities warning that they would be attacked in the future; this was intended to lower the morale of Japanese civilians and convince them that the United States was seeking to minimize civilian casualties. As these cities were very weakly defended, the warnings did not increase the risks facing the American bomber forces. Six of the cities (Aomori, Ichinomiya, Tsu, Uji-Yamada Ōgaki and Uwajima) were attacked on 28 July. No B-29s were lost in the raids on these cities, though six were damaged by attacks from between 40 and 50 fighters and another five were hit by anti-aircraft fire.

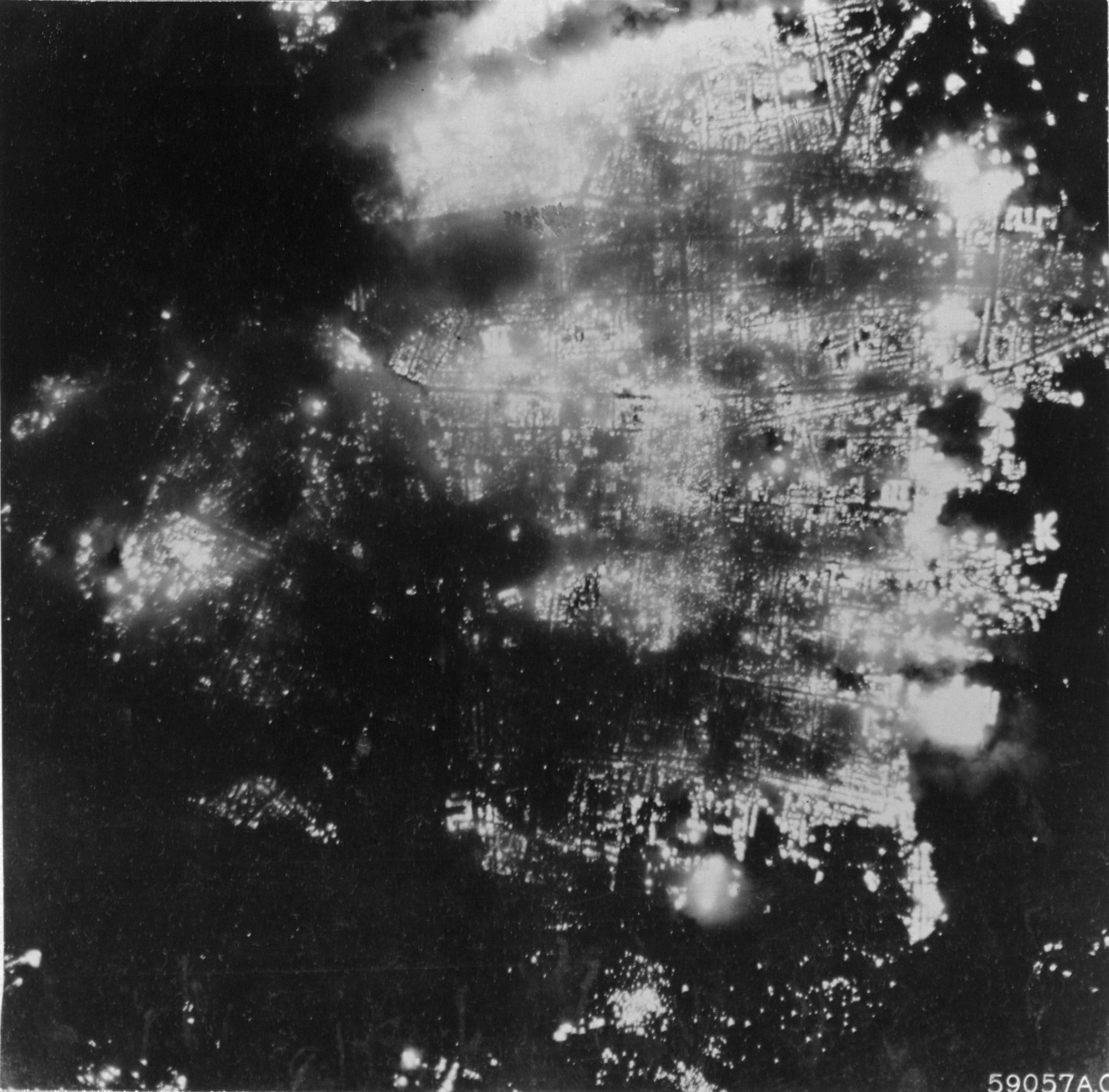
Toyama burns after a B-29 air raid, 1 August 1945

August 1945 began with further large-scale raids against Japanese cities. On 1 August, 836 B-29s staged the largest single raid of World War II, dropping 6,632 tons of bombs and mines. The cities of Hachiōji, Mito, Nagaoka and Toyama were the main targets of this operation; all four suffered extensive damage and 99.5% of buildings in Toyama were destroyed. The cities of Imabari, Maebashi, Nishinomiya and Saga were attacked on 5 August. These raids had also been preceded by propaganda leaflets and radio broadcasts from Saipan warning that the cities would be attacked.

From late June the 315th Bombardment Wing conducted a series of night precision bombing attacks against the Japanese oil industry, independently of the precision day and night incendiary raids. The wing's B-29s were fitted with the advanced AN/APQ-7 radar that allowed targets to be accurately located at night. Arriving in the Marianas in April 1945, the 315th Bombardment Wing underwent a period of operational training before flying its first attack against the Utsube Oil Refinery at Yokkaichi on the night of 26 June. The thirty bombers (out of 38 dispatched) that struck the refinery destroyed or damaged 30 percent of the facility. The unit's next attack was against a refinery at Kudamatsu three nights later, and on the night of 2 July it struck another refinery at Minoshima. On the night of 6 and 7 July the 315th Bombardment Wing destroyed the Maruzen oil refinery near Osaka, and three nights later it completed the destruction of the Utsube refinery. The wing had conducted fifteen operations against Japanese oil facilities by the end of the war. During these attacks it destroyed six of the nine targets attacked for the loss of four B-29s. However, as Japan had almost no crude oil to refine due to the Allied naval blockade of the home islands these raids had little impact on the country's war effort.

During mid-July the USAAF strategic bomber forces in the Pacific were reorganized. On 16 July, XXI Bomber Command was re-designated the Twentieth Air Force and LeMay appointed its commander. Two days later the United States Strategic Air Forces in the Pacific (USASTAF) was established at Guam under the command of General Carl Spaatz. USASTAF's role was to command the Twentieth Air Force as well as the Eighth Air Force, which at the time was moving from Europe to Okinawa. The Eighth Air Force was led by James Doolittle (who had been promoted to general) and was being reequipped with B-29s. The Commonwealth Tiger Force, which was to include Australian, British, Canadian and New Zealand heavy bomber squadrons and attack Japan from Okinawa, was also to come under the command of USASTAF when it arrived in the region during late 1945.

== Aerial mine laying ==
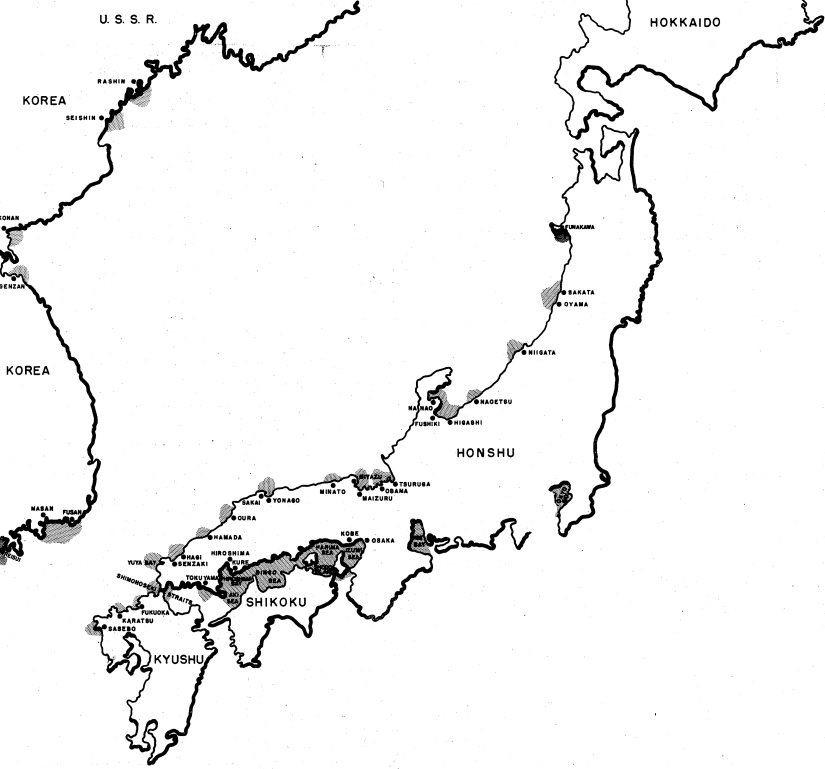
A map showing the areas of Japanese and Korean waters mined by the Twentieth Air Force up to 31 July 1945

From mid-1944, the U.S. Navy pressed for B-29s to be used to lay naval mines in Japan's home waters to strengthen the blockade of the country. Arnold and his staff were unenthusiastic about these proposals, however, as they believed that such missions would divert too many Superfortresses away from precision bombing attacks. In response to repeated requests from the Navy, Arnold decided in November 1944 to begin mine-laying operations once sufficient aircraft were available. In January 1945, LeMay selected the 313th Bombardment Wing to be the Twentieth Air Force's specialist mine-laying unit, and the Navy provided assistance with its training and logistics. LeMay designated the aerial mining campaign Operation Starvation. As the United States had only occasionally used mines up to this time, the Japanese military had placed relatively little emphasis on keeping its minesweeping force up to date. As a result, the IJN was unprepared for the large-scale USAAF offensive.

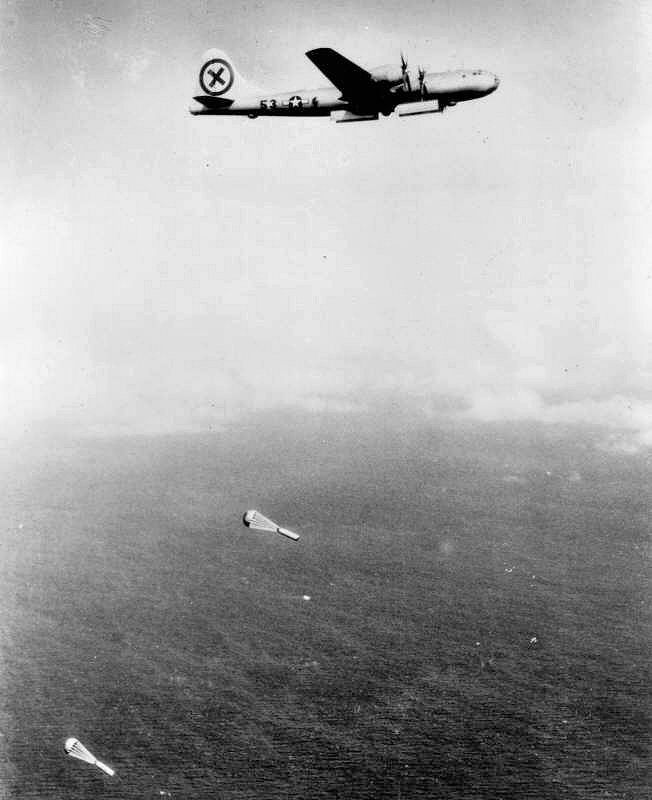
A Tinian-based B-29 dropping sea mines over Japanese home waters, 1944

The 313th Bombardment Wing conducted its first mine-laying operation on the night of 27 and 28 March when it mined the Shimonoseki Strait to prevent Japanese warships from using this route to attack the US landing force off Okinawa. Mine-laying operations were disrupted in April as the wing was assigned to support operations in Okinawa and participate in conventional bombing raids. Its rate of effort increased in May, when it conducted missions against harbors and other choke points around Honshu and Kyushu. The air-dropped minefields greatly disrupted Japanese coastal shipping.

LeMay increased the number of mine-laying sorties in June, and the 505th Bombardment Group joined the 313th Bombardment Wing on occasion. In response to this offensive, the Japanese greatly expanded their mine-sweeping force by 349 ships and 20,000 men and deployed additional anti-aircraft guns around the Shimonoseki Strait. They had little success in clearing minefields or downing the B-29s, however. Many of Japan's major harbors, including those of Tokyo, Yokohama and Nagoya, became closed to shipping. During the last weeks of the war, B-29s continued to drop large numbers of mines off Japan and the campaign was expanded into Korean waters. The 313th Bombardment Wing lost only 16 B-29s during mine-laying operations. Overall, mines dropped by Superfortresses off the home islands sank 293 ships, which represented 9.3 percent of all Japanese merchant shipping destroyed during the Pacific War and 60 percent of losses between April and August 1945. Following the war, the USSBS assessed that the Twentieth Air Force should have placed a greater emphasis on attacking Japanese shipping given the effectiveness of these attacks.

== Naval air attacks ==
Major Allied naval air attacks and bombardments of targets in Japan during July and August 1945

The United States Navy conducted its first attacks against the Japanese home islands in mid-February 1945. This operation was undertaken primarily to destroy Japanese aircraft that could attack the US Navy and Marine Corps forces involved with the landing on Iwo Jima on 19 February, and was conducted by Task Force 58 (TF 58). This task force was the US Navy's main striking force in the Pacific, and comprised by 11 fleet carriers, 5 light aircraft carriers, and a powerful force of escorts. TF 58 approached Japan undetected, and attacked airfields and aircraft factories in the Tokyo region on 16 and 17 February. The American naval aviators claimed 341 "kills" against Japanese aircraft and the destruction of a further 160 on the ground for the loss of 60 aircraft in combat and 28 in accidents. Several ships were also attacked and sunk in Tokyo Bay. The actual Japanese aircraft losses in this operation are uncertain, however; the Imperial General Headquarters admitted losing 78 aircraft in dogfights and did not provide a figure for those destroyed on the ground. TF 58's ships were not attacked during this period in Japanese waters, and on 18 February sailed south to provide direct support to the landings on Iwo Jima. The Task Force attempted a second raid against the Tokyo area on 25 February, but this operation was frustrated by bad weather. The American ships sailed south, and attacked Okinawa from 1 March.

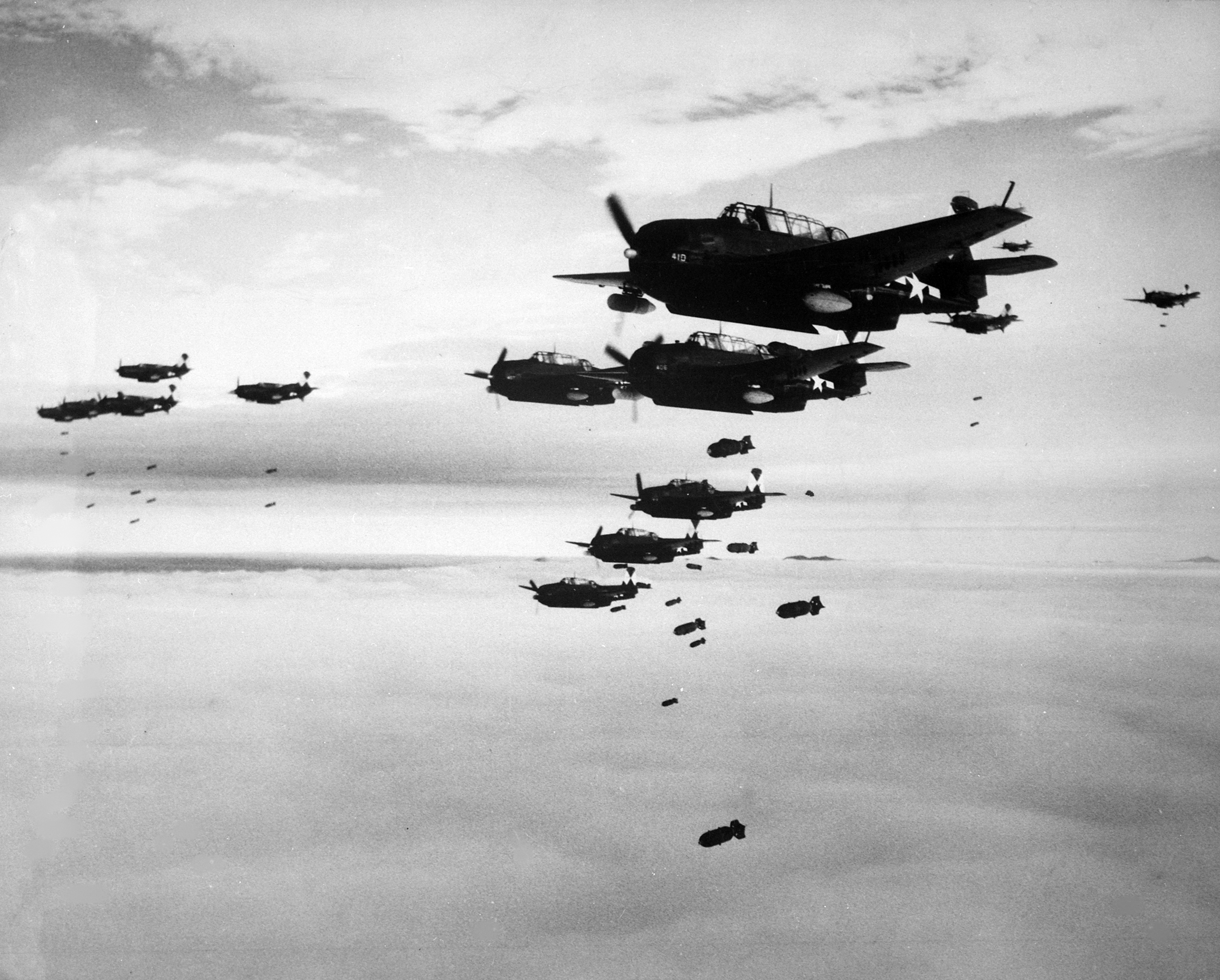
US Navy Grumman TBF Avenger aircraft dropping bombs on Hakodate during July 1945

TF 58 renewed its attacks on Japan in mid-March when it made a series of raids that sought to destroy Japanese aircraft within range of Okinawa prior to the landing there. On 18 March, carrier aircraft struck Japanese airfields and other military facilities on Kyushu. The next day they attacked Japanese warships at Kure and Kobe, damaging the battleship Yamato and aircraft carrier Amagi. The Japanese fought back against these raids with kamikaze and conventional attacks, and inflicted light damage on three carriers on 18 March and severely damaged USS Franklin the next day. On 20 March, TF 58 sailed south but continued fighter sweeps over Kyushu to suppress Japanese aircraft. During the attacks on 18 and 19 March, the American naval aviators claimed to have destroyed 223 Japanese aircraft in the air and 250 on the ground, while the Japanese placed their losses as 161 of the 191 aircraft they committed in the air and an unspecified number on the ground. From 23 March, TF 58 conducted strikes against Okinawa, though its aircraft made further sweeps of Kyushu on 28 and 29 March. Following the landing on 1 April, TF 58 provided air defense for the naval force off Okinawa and regularly conducted patrols over Kyushu. In an attempt to stem the large-scale Japanese air attacks against the Allied ships, part of TF 58 struck at kamikaze aircraft bases on Kyushu and Shikoku on 12 and 13 May. On 27 May, Admiral William Halsey assumed command of the Fifth Fleet (redesignated the Third Fleet) from Admiral Raymond A. Spruance. TF 58, renumbered TF 38, continued operations off Okinawa in late May and June, and on 2 and 3 June one of its task groups attacked airfields on Kyushu. Another attack was made against these airfields on 8 June; two days later, TF 38 left Japanese waters for a period of recuperation at Leyte in the Philippines.

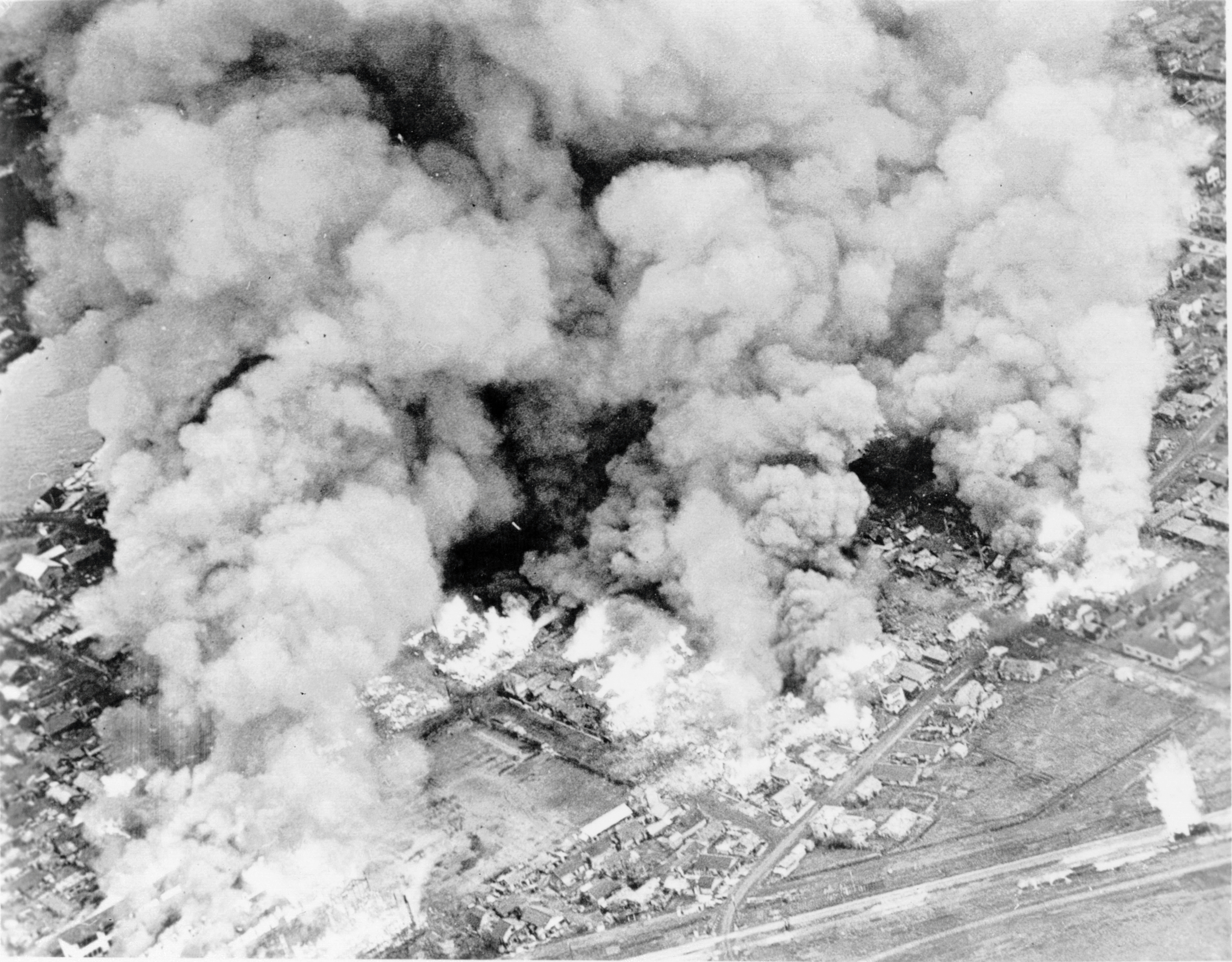
Large clouds of smoke rising from burning buildings in Kushiro after a carrier raid, July 1945

On 1 July, TF 38 sailed from Leyte to strike at the Japanese home islands. At this time the Task Force comprised nine fleet carriers, six flight carriers, and their escorts. Halsey sought to coordinate his fleet's attacks during the last months of the war with those of the USAAF's land-based aircraft, but the two forces often operated separately. On 10 July TF 38's aircraft conducted raids on airfields in the Tokyo region, destroying several aircraft on the ground. No Japanese fighters were encountered in the air, however, as they were being kept in reserve for a planned large-scale suicide attack on the Allied fleet. Following this raid TF 38 steamed north, and began a major attack on Hokkaido and northern Honshu on 14 July. These strikes continued the next day, and sank eight of the twelve train ferries which carried coal from Hokkaido to Honshu and damaged the remaining four. All of the Aomori-Hakodate (Seikan) train ferries were rendered inoperable, severing the main artery that connected Hokkaido to Honshu. Many other ships were also destroyed in and around the Tsugaru Strait, including 70 out of the 272 small sailing ships which carried coal between the islands. Once again no Japanese aircraft opposed this attack, though twenty-five were destroyed on the ground. The loss of the train ferries reduced the amount of coal shipped from Hokkaido to Honshu by 80 percent, which greatly hindered production in Honshu's factories. Cities on Hokkaido such as Hakodate, Sapporo, Otaru, Obihiro and Asahikawa, and rural areas of Hokkaido were also attacked, resulting in significant civilian casualties. This operation has been described as the single most effective strategic air attack of the Pacific War. TF 38's battleships and cruisers also began a series of bombardments of industrial targets on 14 July which continued until almost the end of the war. Around 2,900 people were killed in the bombing of Hokkaido on 14 and 15 July.

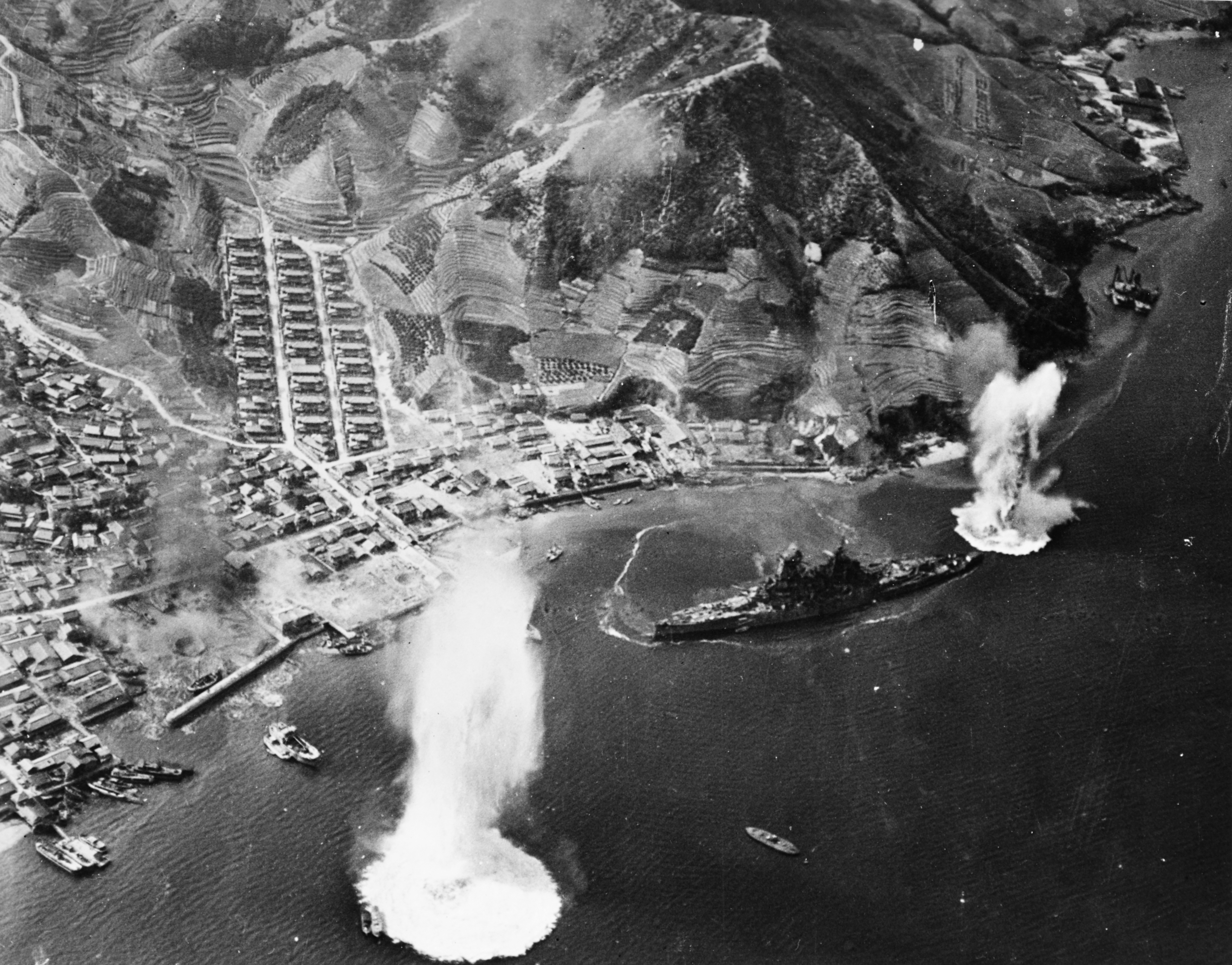
The battleship Haruna under attack on 28 July 1945. She was sunk in Kure along with most of the IJN's surviving large warships.

Following the attacks on Hokkaido and northern Honshu TF 38 sailed south and was reinforced by the main body of the British Pacific Fleet, which was designated Task Force 37 and included another four fleet carriers. Strikes on the Tokyo area on 17 July were disrupted by bad weather, but the next day aircraft from the fleet attacked Yokosuka naval base where they damaged the battleship Nagato and sank four other warships. On 24, 25, and 28 July the Allied fleet attacked Kure and the Inland Sea, sinking most of the surviving large warships of the Japanese navy. A force of 79 USAAF Liberators flying from Okinawa participated in this attack on 28 July. Allied casualties in this operation were heavy, however, as 126 aircraft were shot down. On 29 and 30 July the carrier aircraft struck at Maizuru, sinking three small warships and twelve merchant vessels, before the fleet sailed east to avoid a typhoon and replenish its supplies. Its next attacks against Japan took place on 9 and 10 August, these were directed at a buildup of Japanese aircraft in northern Honshu which Allied intelligence believed were to be used to conduct a commando raid against the B-29 bases in the Marianas. The attacks also included a strike on Ōminato naval base and other targets of opportunity, including shipping. The naval aviators claimed to have destroyed 251 aircraft in their attacks on 9 August and damaged a further 141. On 13 August, TF 38's aircraft attacked the Tokyo region again and claimed to have destroyed 254 Japanese aircraft on the ground and 18 in the air. Another raid was launched against Tokyo on the morning of 15 August, and the 103 aircraft of its first wave attacked their targets. The second wave aborted its attack when word was received that Japan had agreed to surrender. Several Japanese aircraft were shot down while attempting to attack TF 38 later that day, however.

== Raids from Iwo Jima and Okinawa ==
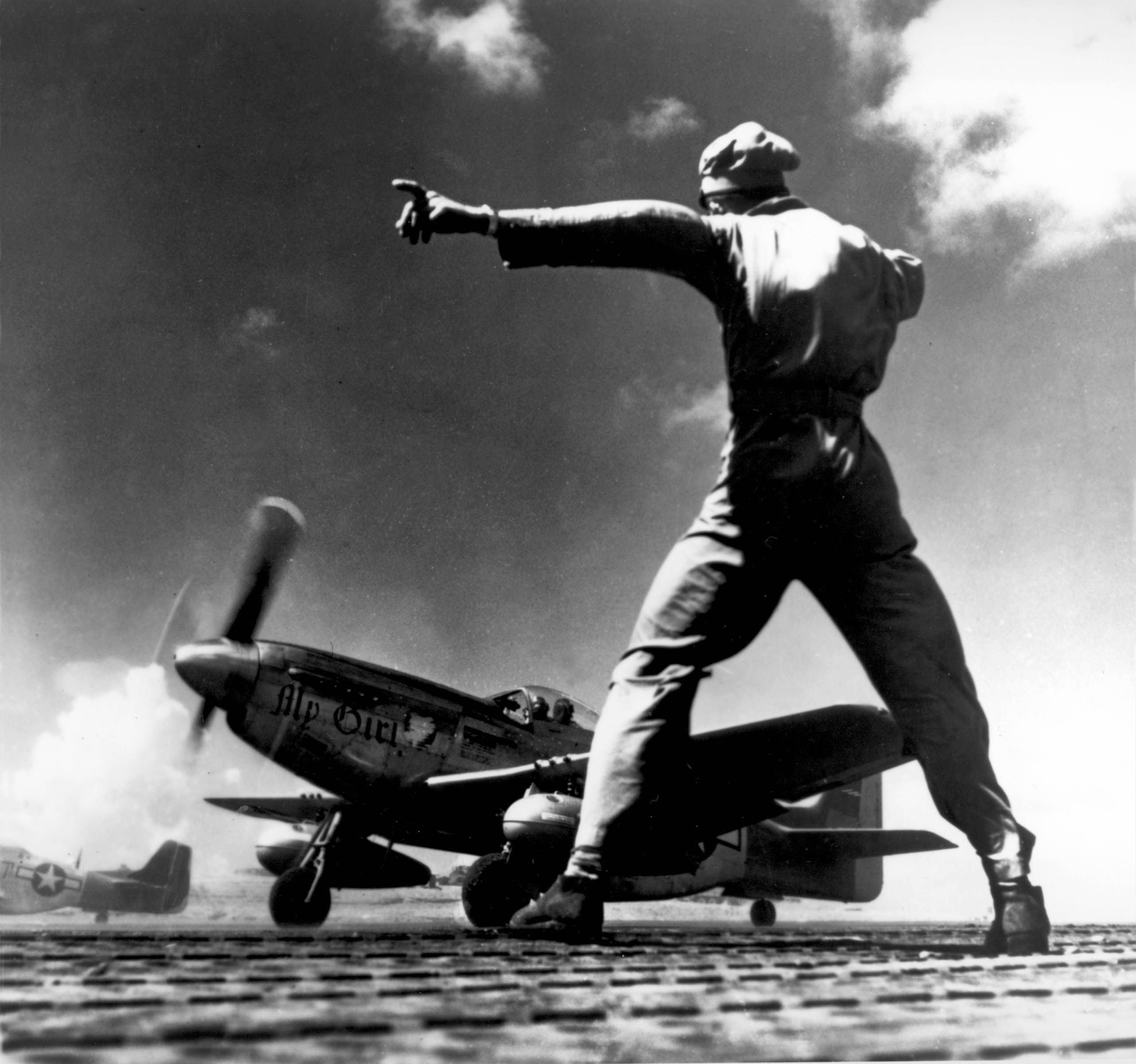
A P-51 Mustang taking off from Iwo Jima

USAAF P-51 Mustang fighters of the VII Fighter Command stationed at Iwo Jima from March 1945 were initially used mainly to escort B-29s. They also conducted a series of independent ground attack missions against targets in the home islands. The first of these operations took place on 16 April, when 57 P-51s strafed Kanoya Air Field in Kyushu. In operations conducted between 26 April and 22 June the American fighter pilots claimed the destruction of 64 Japanese aircraft and damage to another 180 aircraft on the ground, as well as a further ten shot down in flight; these claims were lower than the American planners had expected, however, and the raids were considered unsuccessful. USAAF losses were eleven P-51s to enemy action and seven to other causes.

Due to the lack of Japanese air opposition to the American bomber raids, VII Fighter Command was solely tasked with ground attack missions from July. These raids were frequently made against airfields to destroy aircraft being held in reserve to attack the expected Allied invasion fleet. While the P-51 pilots only occasionally encountered Japanese fighters in the air, the airfields were protected by anti-aircraft batteries and barrage balloons. By the end of the war, VII Fighter Command had conducted 51 ground attack raids, of which 41 were considered successful. The fighter pilots claimed to have destroyed or damaged 1,062 aircraft and 254 ships along with large numbers of buildings and railway rolling stock. American losses were 91 pilots killed and 157 Mustangs destroyed.

From May 1945 aircraft of the USAAF's Fifth Air Force and Seventh Air Force, which were grouped under the Far East Air Force (FEAF), also attacked targets in Kyushu and western Honshu from bases in Okinawa and other locations in the Ryukyu Islands. These raids formed part of the preparation for the invasion of Japan. From 17 May, P-47 Thunderbolt fighters flying from the Ryukyus made frequent day and night patrols over Kyushu to disrupt the Japanese air units there. On 21 June an additional fighter group joined this effort, and the campaign was reinforced by bombers and another fighter group from 1 July. While these American operations were initially fiercely contested, from early July onwards they encountered little opposition as the Japanese aircraft were withdrawn so that they could be preserved for later operations. Between 1 and 13 July, the Americans flew 286 medium and heavy bomber sorties over Kyushu without loss. As the fighters met few Japanese aircraft, they were mainly used to attack transportation infrastructure and targets of opportunity; these included at least two strafing attacks on groups of civilians.

Attacks on airfields and transportation infrastructure in southern Japan continued until the end of the war. By this time the Fifth Air Force's bombers had flown 138 sorties against airfields in Kyushu and the Seventh Air Force had conducted a further 784. Road and railway bridges were attacked by both fighters and bombers, and the city of Kagoshima was frequently bombed. Seventh Air Force B-24 Liberators also bombed the railway terminals in the port of Nagasaki on 31 July and 1 August. While these raids were focused on tactical targets, the Okinawa-based aircraft made several strategic attacks against industrial facilities; these included an unsuccessful raid on a coal liquefaction plant at Ōmuta on 7 August. Bombers of the Fifth and Seventh Air Forces also made firebombing attacks against Tarumizu on 5 August, Kumamoto on 10 August and Kurume the next day. The FEAF staged its last attacks against Japan on 12 August; aircraft were dispatched on 14 August but recalled while en route to their targets. Overall, the two air forces flew 6,435 sorties against targets in Kyushu during July and August for the loss of 43 aircraft to Japanese anti-aircraft guns and fighters.

== Japanese military response ==
=== Air defenses ===
Japan's air defenses were unable to stop the Allied air attacks. Owing to the short range of the country's land-based radar, and Allied attacks on IJN picket ships, the defenders typically had only about an hour to respond to incoming B-29s once they had been detected. Japanese signals intelligence units could provide longer warning times of incoming raids by eavesdropping on the bombers' radio communications, but were unable to predict the target of the attack. As a result, fighter units did not have enough time to scramble and reach the bombers' cruising altitude before they arrived over their target, and most raids were intercepted by only small numbers of aircraft. Moreover, the American bombers were capable of flying faster at high altitude than many Japanese fighters. Even when the fighters managed to close within gun range, the well-built B-29s were often able to sustain large amounts of damage. Due to the difficulty of intercepting and downing B-29s, the Japanese fighter pilots increasingly perceived their efforts as being futile. From August 1944 Japanese aircraft occasionally conducted suicide ramming attacks on B-29s, and several specialized kamikaze fighter units were established in October; by the end of the war, ramming tactics had destroyed nine B-29s and damaged another thirteen for the loss of 21 fighters.

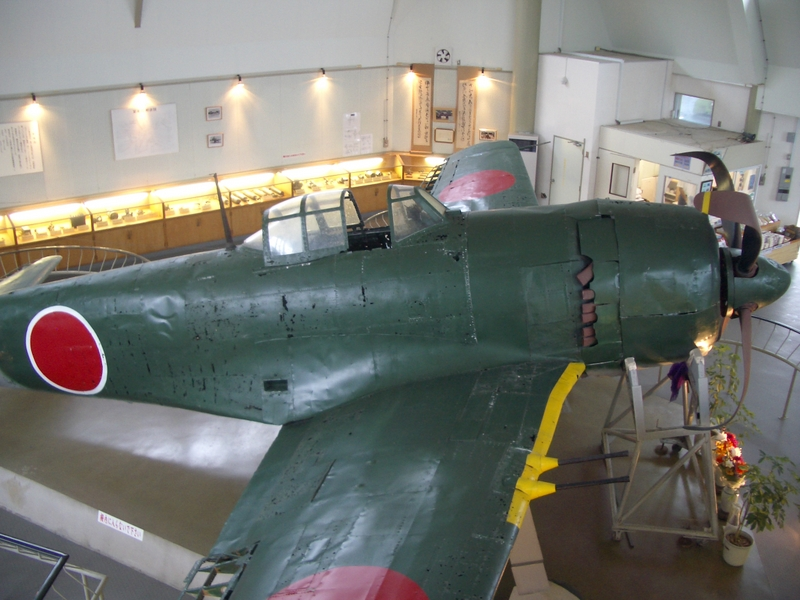
A recovered and preserved Kawanishi N1K fighter which may have been operated by one of the six Japanese airmen from the 343rd Kōkūtai (Air Group) who were downed over the Bungo Strait on 24 July 1945

Air combat was most intense in late 1944 and early 1945. Following the first B-29 raids on Tokyo, the number of IJN aircraft assigned to air defense duties was greatly increased and all 12-centimeter (4.7 in) guns were allocated to protect the capital. Fighters stationed to defend Japan's main industrial areas frequently intercepted American air raids between 24 November 1944 and 25 February 1945, and inflicted significant losses for a period. The number of fighters available declined from late January, however. Poor coordination between the IJAAF and IJN also continued to hamper Japan's defensive efforts throughout this period. The Americans suffered few losses from Japanese fighters during the night raids which were conducted from March 1945 until the end of the war.

Resistance to the air raids decreased sharply from April 1945. On 15 April the IJAAF and IJN air defense units were belatedly placed under a single command when the Air General Army was formed under the command of General Masakazu Kawabe, but by this time the fighter force's effectiveness had been greatly reduced due to high rates of casualties in training accidents and combat. Due to the poor standard of the remaining pilots and the deployment of P-51 Mustangs to escort B-29s, the Japanese leadership decided in April to withdraw their remaining fighters from combat. These aircraft were placed in reserve to counterattack the anticipated Allied invasion. As a result, few of the subsequent Allied raids were intercepted. The effectiveness of Japanese anti-aircraft batteries also decreased during 1945 as the collapse of the national economy led to severe shortages of ammunition. Moreover, as the anti-aircraft guns were mainly stationed near major industrial areas, many of the raids on small cities were almost unopposed. Imperial General Headquarters decided to resume attacks on Allied bombers from late June, but by this time there were too few fighters available for this change of tactics to have any effect. The number of fighters assigned to the Air General Army peaked at just over 500 during June and July, but most frontline units had relatively few serviceable aircraft. During the last weeks of the war Superfortresses were able to operate with near impunity owing to the weakness of the Japanese air defenses; LeMay later claimed that during this period "it was safer to fly a combat mission over Japan than it was to fly a B-29 training mission back in the United States."

Overall, Japanese fighters shot down 74 B-29s, anti-aircraft guns accounted for a further 54, and nineteen were downed by a combination of anti-aircraft guns and fighters. IJAAF and IJN losses during the defense of Japan were 1,450 aircraft in combat and another 2,750 to other causes.

=== Treatment of prisoners of war ===
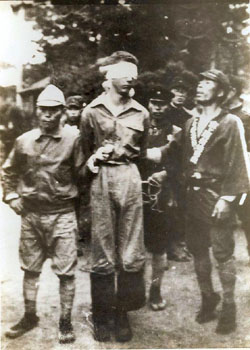
A captured crew member of a downed B-29, July 1945

Many of the Allied airmen who were captured after being shot down over Japan were mistreated. On 8 September 1944, the Cabinet of Japan directed that indiscriminate bombing constituted a war crime. There was, however, no international treaty or instrument protecting a civilian population specifically from attack by aircraft at the time. As a result of the cabinet directions, captured Allied airmen were subject to trial and possible execution. The frequency of such executions differed between military districts, however. While no airmen were executed in the Tōbu district (eastern Musashi), which included Tokyo, those captured in the Tōkai, Chūbu and Seibu (western Musashi) districts were sometimes killed after a brief trial or summarily executed by the Kempeitai ("Military Police Corps"). For instance, 33 American airmen were killed by IJA personnel at Fukuoka, including fifteen who were beheaded shortly after the Japanese Government's intention to surrender was announced on 15 August. Mobs of civilians also killed several Allied airmen before the Japanese military arrived to take the men into custody. In addition to these killings, most captured B-29 crewmen were brutally interrogated by the Kempeitai.

Of the approximately 545 Allied airmen who were captured in the Japanese home islands (excluding the Kuril and Bonin Islands), 132 were executed and twenty-nine were killed by civilians. Another 94 airmen died from other causes while in Japanese custody, including 52 who were killed when they were deliberately left in a prison in Tokyo during the 25 and 26 May raid on the city. Between six and eight US airmen shot down on 5 May were subjected to vivisection at the Kyushu Imperial University; Professor Fukujirō Ishiyama and other doctors conducted four such sessions throughout May and early June. The Western Military Command assisted in arranging these operations. Many of the Japanese personnel responsible for the deaths of Allied airmen were prosecuted in the Yokohama War Crimes Trials following the war. Several of those found guilty were executed and the remainder were imprisoned.

== Atomic bombings and final attacks ==
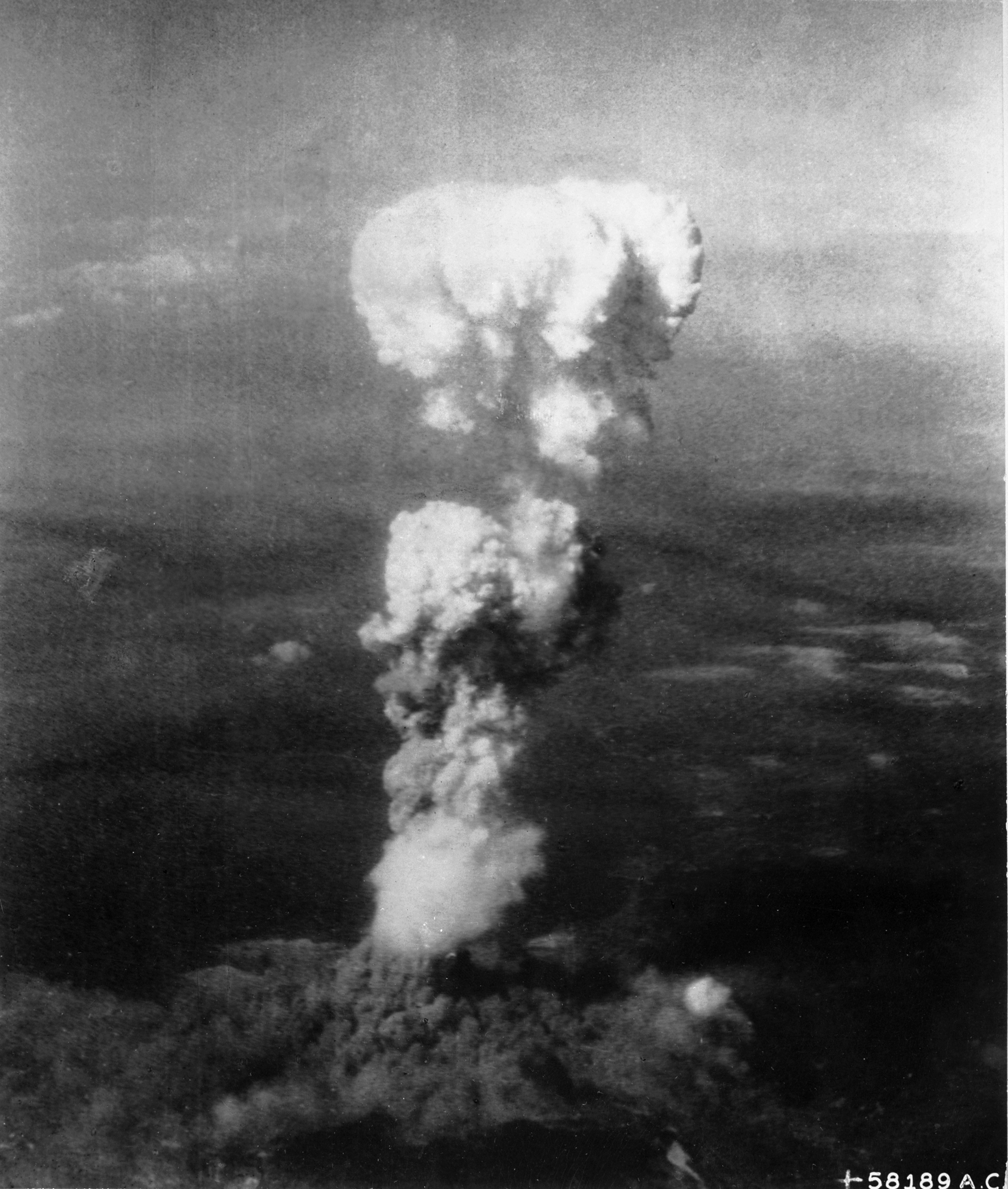
The mushroom cloud from the atomic bomb dropped on Hiroshima on 6 August 1945

Beginning in 1942 the United States, with assistance from Britain and other Allied countries, devoted considerable resources to developing nuclear weapons through the Manhattan Project. In December 1944 the USAAF's 509th Composite Group was formed under the command of Colonel Paul Tibbets to deliver these weapons once they were complete; it deployed to Tinian during May and June 1945. The "Trinity" test of the first nuclear bomb was successfully conducted on 16 July. Four days later the 509th Composite Group's modified "Silverplate" B-29s began flying practice raids against Japanese cities, each armed with a single high-explosive "pumpkin" bomb; further practice missions took place on 24, 26 and 29 July. Japanese fighters did not attempt to intercept these aircraft and their bombing altitude of 30,000 feet (9,100 m) was beyond the range of most anti-aircraft guns. Meanwhile, on 24 July President Harry S. Truman approved (Note: British approval of the use of the bombs on Japan had been recorded at a Combined Policy Committee meeting on 4 July) the use of atomic bombs against Japan and the next day Spaatz received written orders to this effect. These orders specified that the first attack should be made after 3 August, and named Hiroshima, Kokura, Niigata and Nagasaki as targets. Kyoto, Japan's former imperial capital, had been included in an earlier version of the target list but Nagasaki was substituted on the direction of US Secretary of War Henry L. Stimson owing to Kyoto's cultural value; the city had also been excluded from the urban firebombing raids on the same grounds. On 26 July the United States, Britain and China issued the Potsdam Declaration, which demanded Japan's surrender after warning that the country would be devastated if the war continued. The Japanese government rejected the Allied demands on 28 July.

Hiroshima was attacked on 6 August. At 8:15 am local time the B-29 Enola Gay, piloted by Tibbets, dropped the "Little Boy" atomic bomb over the center of the city. The resulting explosion killed tens of thousands of people and destroyed about 4.7 square miles (12 km^{2}) of buildings. The six American aircraft involved in this attack returned safely to the Marianas. Post-war estimates of casualties from the attack on Hiroshima range from 35,000 to 50,000 fatalities and 69,000 to 151,000 injured. More subsequently died as a result of radiation and other injuries. Of the survivors of the bombing, 171,000 were rendered homeless.

Following the attack, a statement from President Truman was broadcast to announce that the United States had used an atomic bomb against Hiroshima and that further air attacks would be conducted on Japan's industrial facilities and transportation network. The statement included a threat that if Japan did not surrender under the terms specified in the Potsdam Declaration it would be subjected to "a rain of ruin from the air, the like of which has never been seen on this earth." Two days later, daylight incendiary raids were conducted against the cities of Yawata and Fukuyama; these attacks destroyed 21 percent of Yawata's urban area and over 73 percent of Fukuyama. Japanese aircraft intercepted the force dispatched against Yawata and shot down a B-29 and five of the escorting P-47s for the loss of approximately twelve fighters.

The second atomic bomb attack was made on 9 August. On this day, the B-29 Bockscar was dispatched to attack Kokura with the "Fat Man" bomb. The city was found to be covered in smoke and haze, however; as a result, the plane's pilot, Major Charles Sweeney, decided to attack the secondary target of Nagasaki instead. The bomb was dropped at 10:58 am local time, and the resulting 20 kiloton explosion destroyed 1.45 square miles (3.8 km^{2}) of buildings in the Urakami district. Official Japanese figures issued in the late 1990s state the total number of people killed as a result of this attack exceeded 100,000. The attack also crippled the city's industrial production; steel production was set back by one year, electrical power was severely reduced for two months and arms production was greatly reduced. All the American aircraft involved in the operation returned safely. The Soviet invasion of Manchuria also began on 9 August, and the Red Army advanced rapidly. On this day, B-29s dropped three million leaflets on Japanese cities warning that atomic bombs would be used to destroy all the country's military resources unless the Emperor ended the war. At this time a third atomic bomb was expected to be ready by the end of August. Eight bombs were scheduled to have been completed by November, and General George Marshall, the Chief of Staff of the U.S. Army, was advocating that they be reserved for use against tactical targets in support of the planned invasion rather than be dropped on cities.

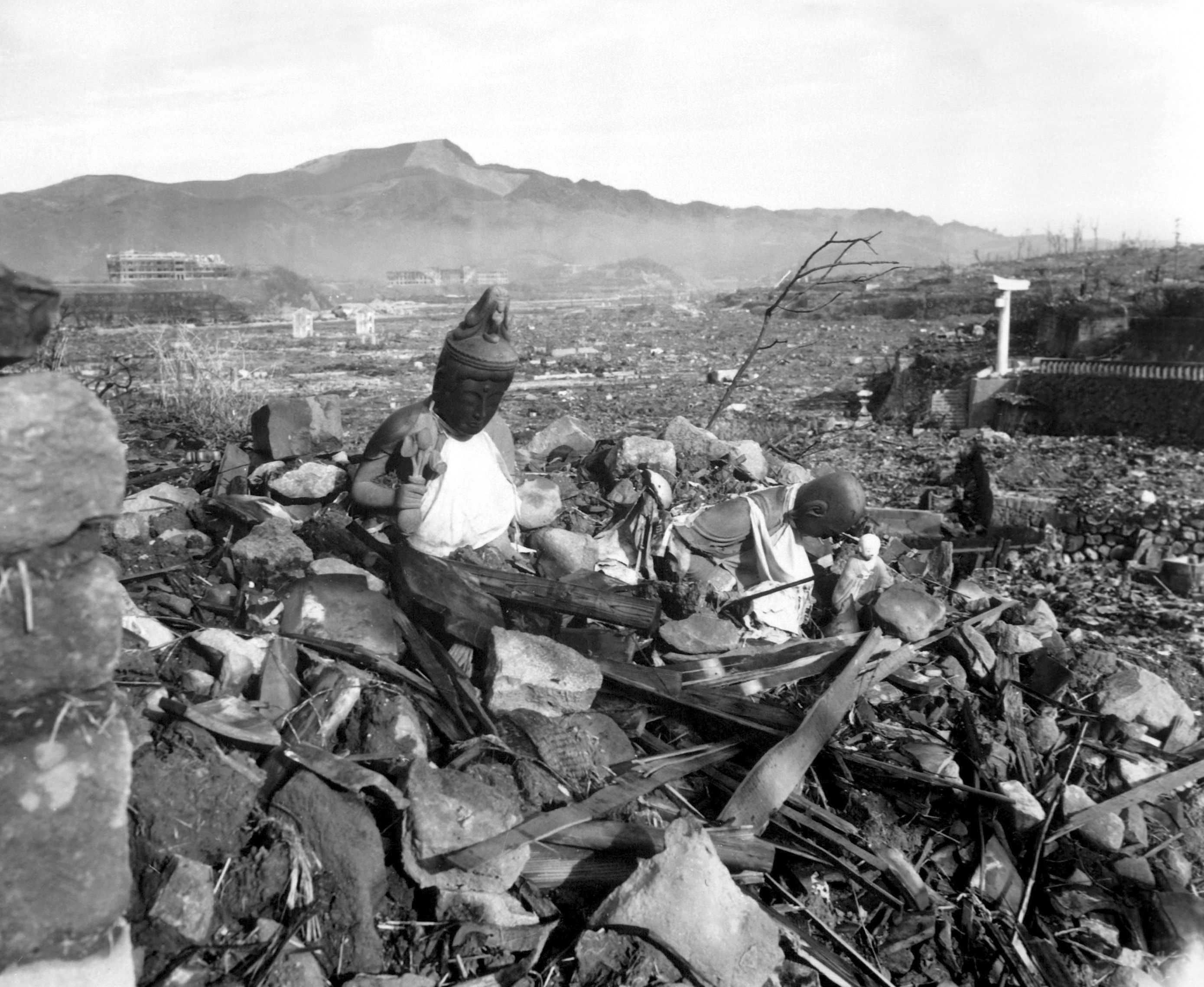
Part of Nagasaki six weeks after the atomic bombing

The Japanese government began negotiations with the Allies about the terms of surrender on 10 August. During this period B-29 attacks on Japan were limited to a raid by the 315th Bombardment Wing against an oil target on the night of 9 and 10 August and a daytime precision bombing attack on a factory in Tokyo on 10 August. The next day, President Truman ordered a halt to the bombing due to the possibility that it would be interpreted as a sign that the peace negotiations had failed. On 11 August, Spaatz issued a new targeting directive for any renewed attacks that reduced the emphasis on bombing cities in favor of intensified attacks on transport infrastructure. On 13 August, B-29s dropped copies of the Japanese government's conditional offer to surrender over Japanese cities. Negotiations appeared to be stalled, and on 14 August Spaatz received orders to resume the bombing campaign. Arnold requested the largest attack possible, and hoped that USASTAF could dispatch 1,000 aircraft against the Tokyo region and other locations in Japan. In fact, 828 B-29s escorted by 186 fighters (for a total of 1,014 aircraft) were dispatched; during the day precision raids were made against targets at Iwakuni, Osaka and Tokoyama and at night the cities of Kumagaya and Isesaki were firebombed. While the Eighth Air Force units at Okinawa had not yet conducted any missions against Japan, General Doolittle decided not to contribute aircraft to this operation as he did not want to risk the lives of the men under his command when the war was effectively over. These were the last attacks conducted against Japan by heavy bombers, as at noon on 15 August Hirohito made a radio broadcast announcing his country's intention to surrender.

== After the war ==
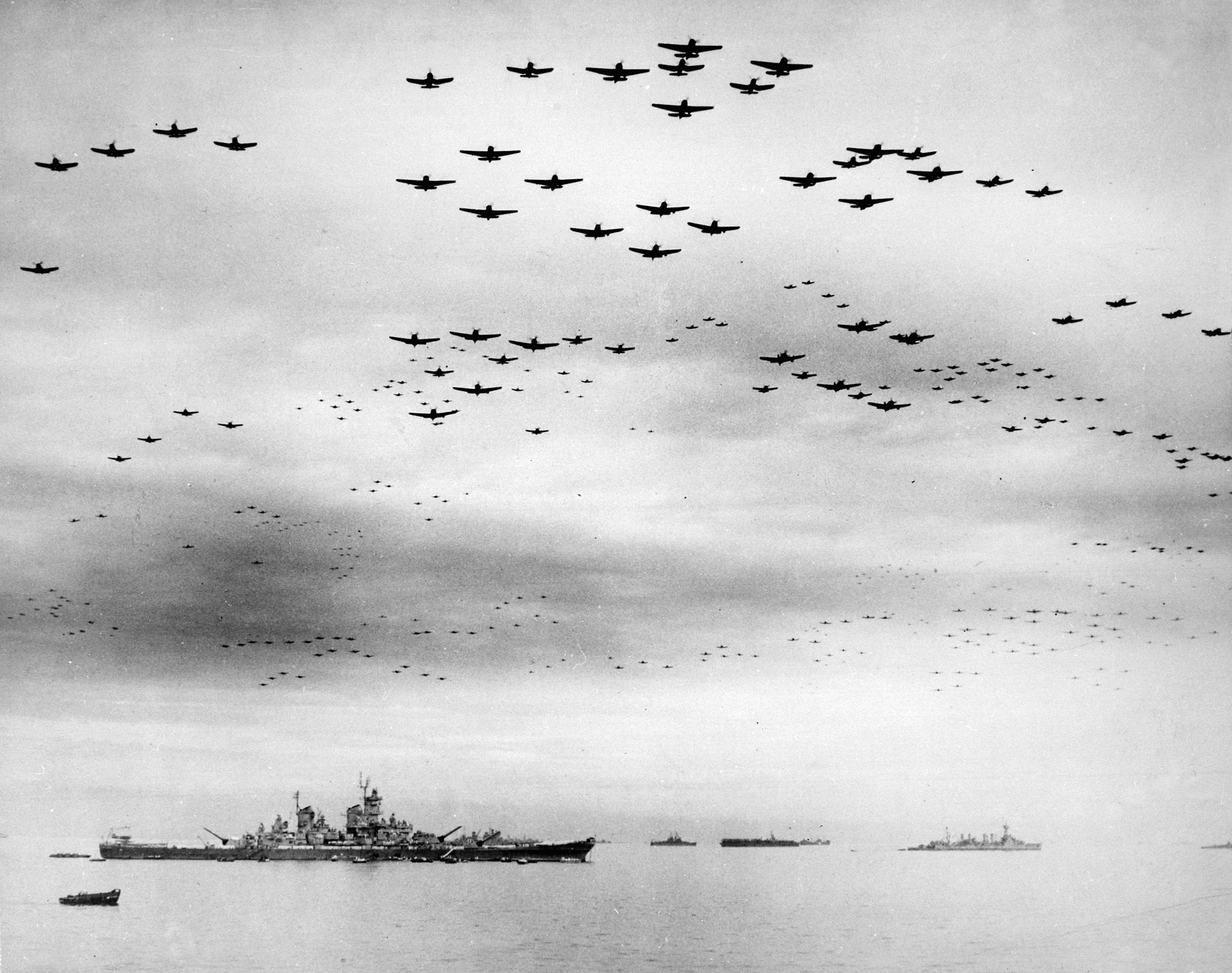
US Navy carrier aircraft flying over the Allied fleet in Tokyo Bay following the Japanese surrender on 2 September 1945

Limited air operations continued over Japan in the weeks following the Japanese government's decision to surrender. On 17 and 18 August, B-32 Dominators flying reconnaissance missions from Okinawa were attacked by IJN fighters near Tokyo. From 17 August the Twentieth Air Force was made responsible for supplying Allied prisoner of war camps in Japan, Korea and China until the prisoners were evacuated. Supply drops began ten days later, and continued until 20 September. During this period the B-29s flew almost 1,000 sorties and delivered close to 4,500 tons of supplies. Eight aircraft crashed during these missions and another was damaged by a Soviet fighter over Korea. The 3rd Photographic Reconnaissance Squadron, which had operated over Japan throughout the bombing campaign, also continued its photo reconnaissance and mapping flights over the home islands during this period. While Spaatz ordered that B-29s and fighters fly continuous show of force patrols of the Tokyo area from 19 August until the formal surrender ceremony took place, these operations were initially frustrated by bad weather and logistics problems. The first patrols were not flown until 30 August, when they were made in conjunction with the landing of General Douglas MacArthur and the US Army's 11th Airborne Division at Atsugi airfield. A similar operation was conducted the next day, and on 2 September 462 B-29s and many naval aircraft overflew the Allied fleet in Tokyo Bay following the surrender ceremony on board USS Missouri.

Allied air units participated in the occupation of Japan after the war. Advance parties of the FEAF began to arrive at Atsugi airfield on 30 August, and units of the Fifth Air Force were established across the home islands during September and October. Besides transporting occupation troops, the Fifth Air Force conducted armed patrols over Japan and Korea as well and also made many photo reconnaissance and mapping sorties. Royal Australian Air Force, British Royal Air Force, Royal New Zealand Air Force, US Navy and US Marine Corps air units were also deployed to Japan for occupation duties. There was no Japanese resistance to the Allied occupation, and the number of air units stationed in the country was gradually reduced from late 1945.

Japan's bomb-damaged cities were rebuilt after the war. War damage and the need to rehouse soldiers and civilians returning from overseas resulted in a shortage of 4.2 million units of housing which, combined with food shortages, led to many civilians being forced to live in harsh conditions. In September 1945 the Japanese government offered to provide material for 300,000 small temporary houses to evacuees, but the emphasis of its policies in this year and 1946 was to stop people returning to the damaged cities. The reconstruction of 115 cities began in 1946, and this work was conducted in line with guidelines developed by the Japanese government. The Allied occupation authorities were not involved in the urban rebuilding effort, but allowed this work to go ahead despite criticizing it as inappropriate to Japan's status as a defeated country. Requisitions of land and buildings for use by the occupation force and a requirement that the Japanese government prioritize the construction of housing for the Allied troops interfered with reconstruction, however. In many cities rebuilding was accompanied by a process of land readjustment which sought to improve the urban layout, though the success of both such readjustment and rebuilding programs varied between locations. Overall, most of the new buildings constructed were of poor quality, and it was not until well after the war that major urban improvement projects were undertaken.

== Assessments ==
=== Casualties and damage ===
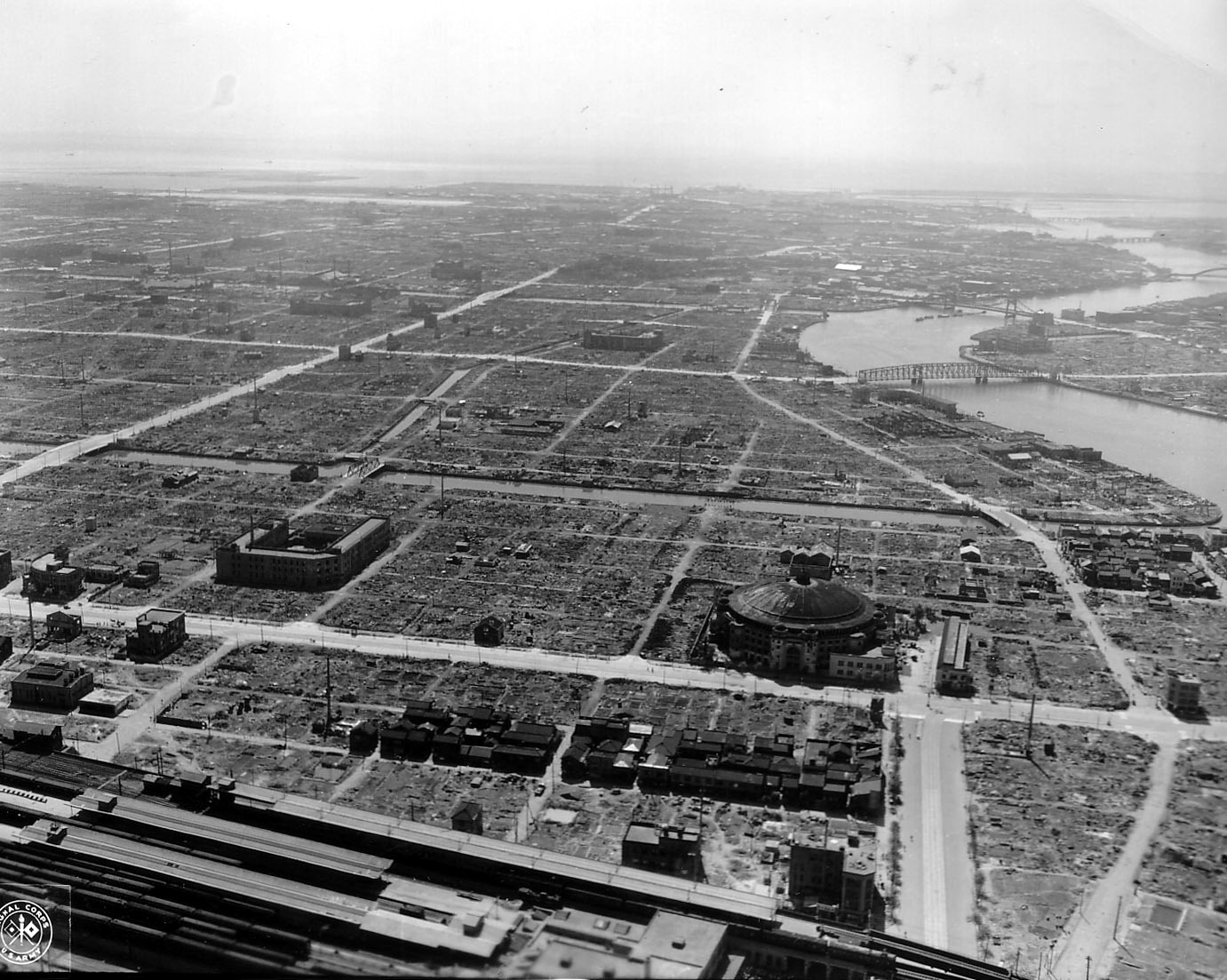
An aerial view of Ryogoku District, Tokyo following the war

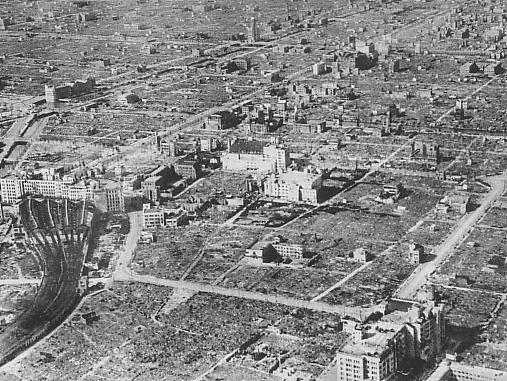
An aerial view of Osaka following the war

The air attacks on Japan caused hundreds of thousands of casualties, though estimates vary considerably. The strategic attacks by the Twentieth Air Force caused most of the casualties and damage. The figures most frequently cited in the literature on the campaign are sourced from the USSBS report The Effects of Bombing on Health and Medical Services in Japan which estimated that 333,000 Japanese were killed and 473,000 wounded. Included in this figure were an estimated 120,000 dead and 160,000 injured in the two atomic bomb attacks.

Another USSBS report, The Effects of Strategic Bombing on Japanese Morale, included a much higher estimate of 900,000 killed and 1.3 million injured which was reached by a Japanese research team using statistical sampling. While this figure is also occasionally cited, the USSBS investigators regarded the work of their statistical teams as unsatisfactory, and the researchers were unable to calculate the error rate of this estimate.

The postwar Japanese government calculated in 1949 that 323,495 people had been killed by air attacks in the home islands. The destruction of buildings housing government records contributed to the uncertainty about the number of casualties. The Twentieth Air Force lost 414 B-29s during attacks on Japan. Over 2,600 American bomber crew members were killed, including POWs who died in captivity, and 433 were wounded.

The following table provides examples of the estimated number of Japanese casualties from air attack in different sources:

Source	Estimate of Japanese casualties from Allied air raids
USSBS, Medical Division (1947)	The Effects of Bombing on Health and Medical Services in Japan: 333,000 killed, 473,000 wounded
USSBS, Morale Division (1947)	The Effects of Strategic Bombing on Japanese Morale: 900,000 killed, 1.3 million injured
Japanese Government (1949)	323,495 killed
Craven and Cate (1953)	About 330,000 killed, 476,000 wounded
Dower (1986)	Approximately 393,367 killed
Bulletin of the Atomic Scientists (1995)	Approximately 500,000 killed
Meilinger (1999)	Approximately 400,000 civilians killed
Hoyt (2000)	300,000 civilians killed and 500,000 wounded
Takai and Sakaida (2001)	241,309 killed, 213,041 injured
Tillman (2010)	At least 330,000 killed
Frank (2013)	About 425,000 killed

Much of Japan's industrial capacity was destroyed by Allied bombing. Over 600 major industrial facilities were destroyed or badly damaged, contributing to a large decline in production. Absenteeism caused by the air attacks further reduced output. It is not possible to determine the exact damage bombing caused to Japan's economy, as the Allied naval blockade also contributed to general breakdown which occurred from late 1944.

In addition to the heavy bomber attacks, the operations by Allied aircraft carriers tightened the blockade by disrupting Japanese coastal shipping. Naval aircraft were unable to carry enough bombs to seriously damage Japanese industrial plants, however. Compounding the effects of the air attacks, Japan's rice crop of 1945 failed. The resulting shortage of rice caused widespread malnutrition, and mass starvation would have occurred had the war continued. In financial terms, the Allied air campaign and attacks on merchant ships destroyed one quarter to one third of Japan's wealth.

The attacks also caused extensive damage to Japan's urban areas. Approximately 40 percent of the urban area of the 66 cities subjected to area attacks were destroyed. This included the loss of about 2.5 million housing units, rendering 8.5 million people homeless. The urban area attacks reduced the morale of the Japanese population, and postwar surveys by the USSBS found that air attacks were the most important factor in convincing the Japanese that the war had been lost. During the final months of the war the raids also contributed to the deterioration of the Japanese social fabric. However, civilian morale did not collapse due to the bombing, and post-war investigations found that most Japanese had remained willing to continue the war if necessary.

Allied air raids significantly influenced the Japanese government's decision to surrender. While the USSBS did not state that any single factor caused the surrender, during interrogations most Japanese wartime leaders nominated the prolonged air attacks on the home islands as the single most important factor which influenced their decision. Prime Minister Kantarō Suzuki stated that the combination of the conventional B-29 raids, Potsdam Declaration and atomic bombings gave the government the opportunity to begin negotiations. Emperor Hirohito cited damage from the attacks, inadequate preparations to resist invasion and the Soviet offensive as his justifications for authorizing the surrender.

To achieve this, the American Twentieth Strategic Air Force, in concert with its Allies, dropped 160,800 tons of bombs on the Japanese home islands. Around 90 percent of the American tonnage fell in the last five months of the war. The financial cost of the campaign to the U.S. was $4 billion, much lower than the $30 billion spent on bomber operations in Europe, and a small proportion of the $330 billion the U.S. government spent on the war.

=== Morality ===
There has been debate over the morality of the air campaign against Japan. During the war the American public approved of the bombing of Germany and Japan, and the few people who criticized the raids were seen as unrealistic or even traitors. Some U.S. government and military personnel believed that the bombing campaign was morally ambiguous, but rarely voiced their views publicly.

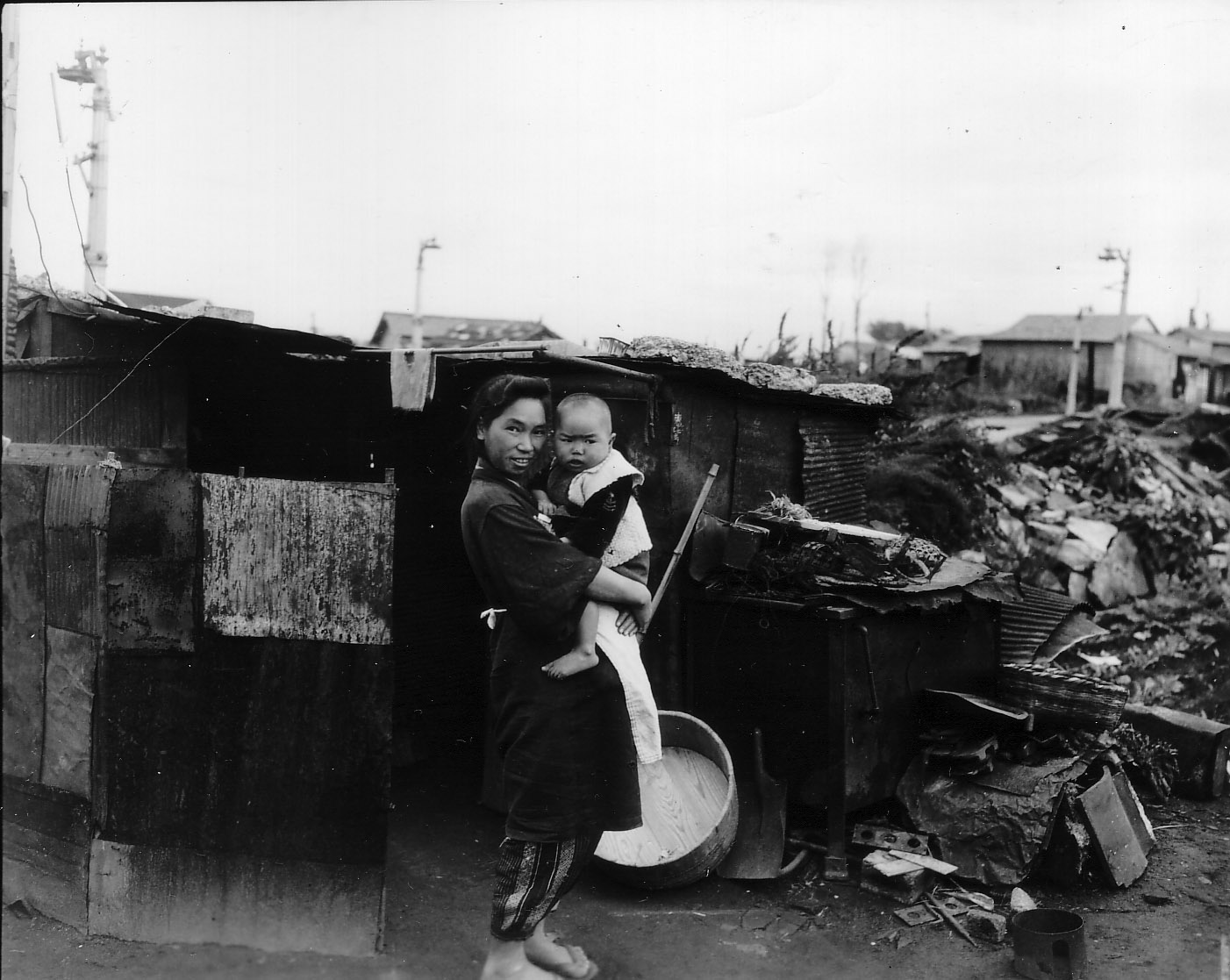
A woman and her child outside their bombed home in Ebisu, Tokyo following the war

The moral concerns over the attacks have focused on the large number of civilian casualties and property damage they caused. British philosopher A. C. Grayling has concluded that the Allied area bombing campaigns against both Japan and Germany constituted moral crimes. Mark Selden described the summer 1945 peak of the bombing campaign as "still perhaps unrivaled in the magnitude of human slaughter" and stated that the factors contributing to its intensity were a combination of "technological breakthroughs, American nationalism, and the erosion of moral and political scruples about killing of civilians, perhaps intensified by the racism that crystallized in the Pacific theater."

Edwin P. Hoyt wrote in 1987 that Japanese people commonly regard the Allied bombing of civilians as the worst atrocity of the war. It has been suggested that anti-Japanese sentiment was a factor motivating the USAAF's emphasis on firebombing in Japan while most of its raids on Germany used precision bombing. However, historian Richard B. Frank argues that this difference was attributable to the evolution in views towards bombing during the war, the limited intelligence on the structure of the Japanese economy available to the Allies and the much greater vulnerability of Japanese cities to incendiary bombs. According to Robert McNamara, an officer in the Army Air Forces under General Curtis LeMay during the bombings of Japan, LeMay once said that had the U.S. lost the war they would have been tried for war crimes; McNamara agrees with this assessment.

The moral defense of the attacks on Japanese cities rests on an argument that they saved lives by shortening the war. The USSBS concluded that the strategic bombing and blockade would have forced Japan to surrender by the end of 1945 even if atomic bombs had not been used and the Soviet Union had remained neutral. Historian E. Bartlett Kerr supported this assessment, and argued that the firebombing of Japan's major cities was the key factor motivating Hirohito's decision to end the war. American historian Barrett Tillman has also written that area attacks were unavoidable because, owing to the limitations of their bombsight and the high winds common over Japan, the B-29s were incapable of bombing individual targets without widespread damage to surrounding areas.

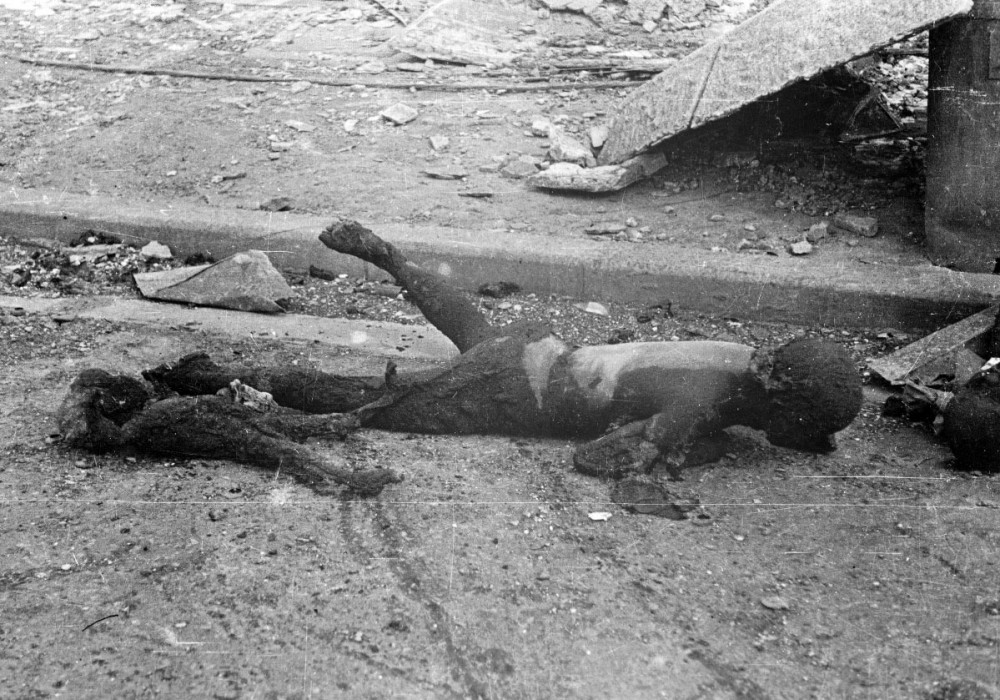
The charred remains of a woman who was carrying a child on her back, Tokyo 1945

The atomic bomb attacks have been the subject of long-running controversy. While conventional attacks inflicted more damage and casualties, discussions of the air campaign have been focused on the use of nuclear weapons. Shortly after the atomic bombings an opinion poll found that about 85 percent of Americans supported the use of atomic weapons, and the wartime generation believed that they had saved millions of lives. Criticisms over the decision to use the bombs have increased over time: arguments include that Japan would have eventually surrendered and that the attacks were made to either intimidate the Soviet Union or justify the Manhattan Project. In 1994, an opinion poll found that 55 percent of Americans supported the decision to bomb Hiroshima and Nagasaki.

When registering the only dissenting opinion of the judges involved in the International Military Tribunal for the Far East in 1947, Justice Radhabinod Pal argued that Japan's leadership had not conspired to commit atrocities and stated that the decision to conduct the atomic bomb attacks was the clearest example of a direct order to conduct "indiscriminate murder" during the Pacific War. Since then, Japanese academics, such as Yuki Tanaka and Tsuyoshi Hasegawa, have argued that use of the bombs was immoral and a war crime. In contrast, President Truman and, more recently, historians such as Paul Fussell have argued that the attacks on Hiroshima and Nagasaki were justified as they induced the Japanese surrender.

On two occasions Japanese citizens have sued their government for damages from the bombings, arguing that the government is culpable for having waged a "reckless war" and for requiring civilians to remain in the targeted areas. In December 2009 the Tokyo District Court dismissed one of the suits, stating that it was not possible to identify individuals who deserve compensation as almost all Japanese suffered as a result of the war. The court also ruled that any compensation should be allocated through the legislative, rather than judicial, process. In December 2011, the Osaka District Court handed down a similar ruling, adding that the government did not violate its constitution in its treatment of bombing victims.

== See also ==
- Strategic bombing during World War II
