= List of accolades received by Hayao Miyazaki =

Hayao Miyazaki awards and nominations
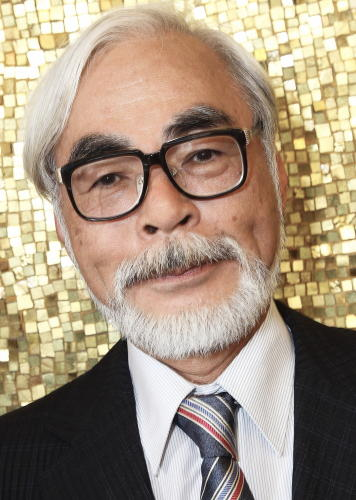
- Miyazaki at the 2008 Venice Film Festival
Awards and nominations
Award	Wins	Nominations
Academy Awards	2	4
Anime Grand Prix	3	3
Annecy International Animated Film Festival	1	1
Annie Awards	5	14
Argentine Film Critics Association	0	1
Asia Pacific Screen Awards	0	1
Asian Film Awards	0	1
Astra Film and Creative Arts Awards	1	2
Austin Film Critics Association Awards	0	2
Berlin International Film Festival	1	1
Blue Ribbon Awards	3	3
Boston Society of Film Critics Awards	3	3
British Academy Film Awards	1	2
British Independent Film Awards	0	1
Broadcast Film Critics Association	1	2
Cambridge Film Festival	1	1
CEC Awards	1	1
César Awards	0	1
Chicago Film Critics Association Awards	2	6
Cinekid Festival	1	1
Critics' Choice Awards	1	3
Dallas–Fort Worth Film Critics Association Awards	2	3
Dorian Awards	1	2
Durban International Film Festival	1	1
EDA Awards	2	2
European Film Awards	0	1
Film Critics Circle of Australia	1	1
Florida Film Critics Circle Awards	4	5
Georgia Film Critics Association Awards	1	3
Golden Globe Awards	1	2
Hochi Film Awards	1	1
Hollywood Film Awards	1	1
Hong Kong Film Awards	1	3
Houston Film Critics Society Awards	0	2
Hugo Awards	0	1
Imagine Film Festival	2	2
International Cinephile Society Awards	2	3
International Horror Guild Awards	0	1
Japan Academy Film Prize	6	6
Japan Media Arts Festival	3	3
Kinema Junpo Awards	14	14
London Film Critics' Circle Awards	2	3
Los Angeles Film Critics Association Awards	2	3
Mainichi Film Awards	18	18
Mill Valley Film Festival	1	1
National Board of Review	3	3
National Cartoonists Society Division Awards	1	1
Nebula Awards	1	3
New York Film Critics Circle Awards	4	4
New York Film Critics Online Awards	2	2
Nikkan Sports Film Awards	3	3
Online Film Critics Society Awards	3	10
San Diego Film Critics Society Awards	2	2
San Francisco Bay Area Film Critics Circle Awards	1	1
San Francisco Film Critics Circle Awards	0	1
San Francisco International Film Festival	1	1
Satellite Awards	3	4
Saturn Awards	1	5
Seattle Film Critics Society	0	2
Seattle International Film Festival	1	1
Sitges Film Festival	0	1
St. Louis Film Critics Association	2	2
Tokyo Anime Awards	12	12
Tokyo Sports Film Awards	1	1
Toronto Film Critics Association Awards	2	2
Toronto International Film Festival	1	1
Venice Film Festival	2	6
Village Voice Film Poll	1	1
Washington D.C. Area Film Critics Association Awards	0	3
Women Film Critics Circle Awards	1	1

Totals (Note: Certain award groups do not simply award one winner. They acknowledge several different recipients, have runners-up, and have third place. Since this is a specific recognition and is different from losing an award, runner-up mentions are considered wins in this award tally. For simplification and to avoid errors, each award in this list has been presumed to have had a prior nomination.)
- Wins: 141
- Nominations: 209
- Honours: 8

Hayao Miyazaki (Japanese: 宮崎 駿, Hepburn: Miyazaki Hayao; born January 5, 1941) is a Japanese film director, producer, screenwriter, animator, author, and manga artist. A co-founder of Studio Ghibli, he has attained international acclaim as a masterful storyteller and as a maker of anime feature films. His works are characterized by the recurrence of progressive themes, such as feminism, environmentalism, pacifism, love, and family. His films' protagonists are often strong girls or young women, and several of his films present morally ambiguous antagonists with redeeming qualities.

In the course of his career, Miyazaki has received multiple awards and nominations. His first feature films, The Castle of Cagliostro and Nausicaä of the Valley of the Wind, earned him the Ōfuji Noburō Award at the Mainichi Film Awards in 1979 and 1984, respectively. His film Laputa: Castle in the Sky won Best Anime at the Anime Grand Prix in 1986, and My Neighbor Totoro won the Special Award at the Blue Ribbon Awards in 1989. He received several awards for his work on Kiki's Delivery Service in 1990, including Best Japanese Film at the Golden Gross Awards and the Special Award at the Japan Academy Film Prize. Porco Rosso also won the Mainichi Film Award for Best Animation Film in 1993.

Miyazaki's film Princess Mononoke was the first animated film to win the Japan Academy Prize for Picture of the Year; its distribution to the Western world greatly increased Ghibli's popularity and influence outside Japan, and his 2001 film Spirited Away won the Academy Award for Best Animated Feature at the 75th Academy Awards. His 2004 film Howl's Moving Castle and 2009 film Ponyo received several awards, including Animation of the Year at the Tokyo Anime Awards, and both were nominated for the Annie Award for Directing in a Feature Production. His 2013 film The Wind Rises was also highly awarded; it received Animation of the Year from the Japan Academy Film Prize, and a nomination for Best Foreign Language Film at the 71st Golden Globe Awards. Howl's Moving Castle and The Wind Rises were nominated for Best Animated Feature at the 78th and 86th Academy Awards. Miyazaki was awarded the Academy Honorary Award in November 2014, for his impact on animation and cinema. His 2023 film The Boy and the Heron won numerous awards, including the Academy Award for Best Animated Feature at the 96th Academy Awards in 2024.

== Films ==
=== The Castle of Cagliostro ===
The Castle of Cagliostro was released in Japan on December 15, 1979.

Award	Year	Category	Result	Ref.
Academy of Science Fiction, Fantasy and Horror Films Awards	1981	Best International Film	Nominated	
Mainichi Film Awards	1979	Ōfuji Noburō Award	Won	

=== Nausicaä of the Valley of the Wind ===
Nausicaä of the Valley of the Wind was released on March 11, 1984. It grossed ¥1.48 billion at the box office, and made an additional ¥742 million in distribution income.

Award	Year	Category	Result	Ref.
Anime Grand Prix	1984	Best Anime	Won	
Kinema Junpo Awards	1984	Reader's Choice Japanese Film Director of the Year	Won	
Kinema Junpo Awards	1984	Best Film of the Year	Runner-up	
Mainichi Film Awards	1984	Ōfuji Noburō Award	Won	

=== Laputa: Castle in the Sky ===
Laputa: Castle in the Sky was released on August 2, 1986.

Award	Year	Category	Result	Ref.
Anime Grand Prix	1986	Best Anime	Won	
Kinema Junpo Awards	1986	Best Film of the Year	Runner-up	
Mainichi Film Awards	1986	Ōfuji Noburō Award	Won	

=== My Neighbor Totoro ===
My Neighbor Totoro was released on April 16, 1988. While it was commercially unsuccessful at the box office, merchandising was successful, and it received critical acclaim.

Award	Year	Category	Result	Ref.
Blue Ribbon Awards	1989	Special Award	Won	
Kinema Junpo Awards	1989	Best Japanese Film	Won	
Kinema Junpo Awards	1989	Reader's Choice Japanese Film Director of the Year	Won	
Mainichi Film Awards	1989	Best Film	Won	
Mainichi Film Awards	1989	Ōfuji Noburō Award	Won	

=== Kiki's Delivery Service ===
Kiki's Delivery Service premiered on July 29, 1989. It earned ¥2.15 billion at the box office, and was the highest-grossing film in Japan in 1989.

Award	Year	Category	Result	Ref.
Anime Grand Prix	1990	Best Anime	Won	
Japan Academy Film Prize	1990	Special Award	Won	
Kinema Junpo Awards	1990	Reader's Choice Japanese Film Director of the Year	Won	
Kinema Junpo Awards	1990	Best Film of the Year	Runner-up	
Mainichi Film Awards	1990	Best Animation Film	Won	

=== Porco Rosso ===
Porco Rosso was released on July 18, 1992. The film was commercially successful and remained one of the highest-grossing films in Japan for several years.

Award	Year	Category	Result	Ref.
Annecy International Animated Film Festival	1993	Best Film	Won	
Kinema Junpo Awards	1993	Best Film of the Year	Runner-up	
Mainichi Film Awards	1993	Best Animation Film	Won	

=== Princess Mononoke ===
Princess Mononoke was released on July 12, 1997. It was commercially successful, becoming the highest-grossing film in Japan for several months. (Note: Princess Mononoke was eclipsed as the highest-grossing film in Japan by Titanic, released several months later.) Upon its release in Western markets, it was largely unsuccessful at the box office, grossing about US$2.3 million.

Award	Year	Category	Result	Ref.
Annie Awards	2000	Outstanding Individual Achievement for Directing in an Animated Feature Production	Nominated	
Blue Ribbon Awards	1998	Special Award	Won	
Hochi Film Awards	1997	Special Award	Won	
Japan Academy Film Prize	1998	Picture of the Year	Won	
Japan Media Arts Festival	1997	Grand Prize in Animation	Won	
Kinema Junpo Awards	1998	Reader's Choice Japanese Film Director of the Year	Won	
Kinema Junpo Awards	1998	Best Film of the Year	Runner-up	
Mainichi Film Awards	1998	Best Animation Film	Won	
Mainichi Film Awards	1998	Best Film	Won	
Mainichi Film Awards	1998	Readers' Choice Award – Best Film	Won	
Nebula Awards	2001	Best Script	Nominated	
Nikkan Sports Film Awards	1997	Best Director	Won	
Nikkan Sports Film Awards	1997	Yujiro Ishihara Award	Won	
Tokyo Sports Film Awards	1997	Best Director	Won	

=== Spirited Away ===
Spirited Away was released on July 20, 2001; it received critical acclaim, and is considered among the greatest films of the 2000s. The film was also commercially successful, earning ¥30.4 billion (US$289.1 million) at the box office. It became the highest-grossing film in Japan, a record it maintained for almost 20 years. (Note: Spirited Away was eclipsed as the highest-grossing film in Japan by Demon Slayer: Kimetsu no Yaiba the Movie: Mugen Train in December 2020.)

Award	Year	Category	Result	Ref.
Academy Awards	2003	Best Animated Feature	Won	
Amsterdam Fantastic Film Festival	2003	Silver Scream Award	Won	
Annie Awards	2003	Best Animated Feature	Won	
Annie Awards	2003	Directing in an Animated Feature Production	Won	
Annie Awards	2003	Outstanding Writing in an Animated Feature Production	Won	
Argentine Film Critics Association	2004	Silver Condor Award for Best Foreign Film	Nominated	
Berlin International Film Festival	2002	Golden Bear	Won	
Blue Ribbon Awards	2002	Best Film	Won	
Boston Society of Film Critics Awards	2002	Special Commendation (Note: Awarded for "artistic contribution to the field of animation")	Won	
British Academy Film Awards	2004	Best Film Not in the English Language	Nominated	
British Independent Film Awards	2003	Best Foreign Independent Film	Nominated	
Broadcast Film Critics Association	2003	Best Animated Feature	Won	
Cambridge Film Festival	2003	Audience Award – Best Film	Won	
César Awards	2003	Best Foreign Film	Nominated	
Chicago Film Critics Association Awards	2003	Best Foreign Language Film	Nominated	
Cinekid Festival	2002	Cinekid Film Award	Won (Note: Tied with The Little Bird Freak)	
CEC Awards	2003	Best Foreign Film	Won	
Critics' Choice Awards	2003	Best Animated Feature	Won	
Dallas–Fort Worth Film Critics Association Awards	2003	Best Animated Film	Won	
Durban International Film Festival	2002	Best Film	Won	
European Film Awards	2002	Screen International Award	Nominated	
Film Critics Circle of Australia	2003	Best Foreign-Language Film	Won	
Florida Film Critics Circle Awards	2003	Best Animated Film	Won	
Hong Kong Film Awards	2002	Best Asian Film	Won	
Hugo Awards	2003	Best Dramatic Presentation – Long Form	Nominated	
International Horror Guild Awards	2003	Best Movie	Nominated	
Japan Academy Film Prize	2002	Picture of the Year	Won	
Japan Media Arts Festival	2002	Grand Prize in Animation	Won	
Kinema Junpo Awards	2002	Reader's Choice – Best Film	Won	
Kinema Junpo Awards	2002	Reader's Choice Japanese Director of the Year	Won	
Kinema Junpo Awards	2002	Best Film of the Year	Runner-up	
London Film Critics' Circle Awards	2004	Foreign Language Film of the Year	Nominated	
Los Angeles Film Critics Association Awards	2002	Best Animated Film	Won	
Mainichi Film Awards	2002	Best Animation Film	Won	
Mainichi Film Awards	2002	Best Director	Won	
Mainichi Film Awards	2002	Best Film	Won	
Mainichi Film Awards	2002	Readers' Choice Award – Best Film	Won	
National Board of Review	2002	Best Animated Feature	Won	
Nebula Awards	2004	Best Script	Nominated	
New York Film Critics Circle Awards	2002	Best Animated Film	Won	
New York Film Critics Online Awards	2002	Best Animated Feature	Won	
Nikkan Sports Film Awards	2002	Best Film	Won	
Online Film Critics Society Awards	2003	Best Animated Film	Won	
Online Film Critics Society Awards	2003	Best Foreign Language Film	Nominated	
San Francisco International Film Festival	2002	Audience Award – Best Narrative Feature	Won	
Satellite Awards	2003	Best Animated or Mixed Media Feature	Won	
Saturn Awards	2003	Best Animated Film	Won	
Saturn Awards	2003	Best Writing	Nominated	
Sitges Film Festival	2002	Best Film	Nominated	
Tokyo Anime Awards	2002	Animation of the Year	Won	
Tokyo Anime Awards	2002	Best Art Direction	Won	
Tokyo Anime Awards	2002	Best Director	Won	
Tokyo Anime Awards	2002	Best Screenplay	Won	

=== Howl's Moving Castle ===
Howl's Moving Castle was released on November 20, 2004, and received widespread critical acclaim. In Japan, the film grossed a record $14.5 million in its first week of release. It remains among the highest-grossing films in Japan, with a worldwide gross of over ¥19.3 billion.

Award	Year	Category	Result	Ref.
Academy Awards	2006	Best Animated Feature	Nominated	
Annie Awards	2006	Directing in a Feature Production	Nominated	
Annie Awards	2006	Outstanding Writing in a Feature Production	Nominated	
Broadcast Film Critics Association Awards	2006	Best Animated Feature	Nominated	
Hollywood Film Awards	2005	Animation of the Year	Won	
Hong Kong Film Awards	2006	Best Asian Film	Nominated	
Japan Media Arts Festival	2004	Excellence Award in Animation	Won	
Mainichi Film Awards	2005	Readers' Choice Award – Best Film	Won	
Nebula Awards	2007	Best Script	Won	
New York Film Critics Circle Awards	2005	Best Animated Film	Won	
Online Film Critics Society Awards	2006	Best Animated Feature	Nominated	
San Diego Film Critics Society Awards	2005	Best Animated Film	Won	
Satellite Awards	2005	Best Animated or Mixed Media Feature	Nominated	
Saturn Awards	2006	Best Animated Film	Nominated	
Seattle International Film Festival	2005	Golden Space Needle Award	Runner-up	
Catalonian International Film Festival	2004	Audience Award – Best Feature Film	Won	
Catalonian International Film Festival	2004	Best Film	Nominated	
Tokyo Anime Awards	2005	Animation of the Year	Won	
Tokyo Anime Awards	2005	Best Director	Won	
Venice Film Festival	2004	Golden Osella for Outstanding Technical Contribution	Won	
Venice Film Festival	2004	Golden Lion	Nominated	

=== Ponyo ===
Ponyo was released on July 19, 2008. The film was also a commercial success, earning ¥10 billion (US$93.2 million) in its first month and ¥15.5 billion by the end of 2008, placing it among the highest-grossing films in Japan.

Award	Year	Category	Result	Ref.
Annie Awards	2010	Directing in a Feature Production	Nominated	
Asian Film Awards	2009	Best Director	Nominated	
Chicago Film Critics Association Awards	2009	Best Animated Feature	Nominated	
Hong Kong Film Awards	2010	Best Asian Film	Nominated	
Japan Academy Film Prize	2009	Animation of the Year	Won	
Online Film Critics Society Awards	2010	Best Animated Feature	Nominated	
Tokyo Anime Awards	2009	Best Domestic Feature	Won	
Tokyo Anime Awards	2009	Best Director	Won	
Tokyo Anime Awards	2009	Best Original Story	Won	
Tokyo Anime Awards	2009	Animation of the Year	Won	
Venice Film Festival	2008	Future Film Festival Digital Award	Nominated	
Venice Film Festival	2008	Mimmo Rotella Foundation Award	Won	
Venice Film Festival	2008	Golden Lion	Nominated	
Washington D.C. Area Film Critics Association Awards	2009	Best Animated Feature	Nominated	

=== The Wind Rises ===
The Wind Rises premiered on July 20, 2013, and received critical acclaim. It was also commercially successful, grossing ¥11.6 billion (US$110 million) at the Japanese box office, becoming the highest-grossing film in Japan in 2013.

Award	Year	Category	Result	Ref.
Academy Awards	2014	Best Animated Feature	Nominated	
Annie Awards	2013	Best Animated Feature	Nominated	
Annie Awards	2013	Writing in an Animated Feature Production	Won	
Asia Pacific Screen Awards	2013	Best Animated Feature Film	Nominated	
Boston Society of Film Critics Awards	2013	Best Animated Film	Won	
Chicago Film Critics Association Awards	2013	Best Foreign Language Film	Nominated	
Chicago Film Critics Association Awards	2013	Best Animated Feature	Won	
Critics' Choice Movie Awards	2013	Best Animated Feature	Nominated	
Dallas–Fort Worth Film Critics Association Awards	2013	Best Foreign Language Film	Nominated	
EDA Awards	2013	Best Animated Feature	Won	
Florida Film Critics Circle Awards	2013	Best Animated Feature	Runner-up	
Georgia Film Critics Association Awards	2014	Best Animated Film	Nominated	
Golden Globe Awards	2013	Best Foreign Language Film	Nominated	
Houston Film Critics Society Awards	2013	Best Animated Film	Nominated	
International Cinephile Society Awards	2014	Best Animated Film	Runner-up	
Japan Academy Film Prize	2013	Animation of the Year	Won	
Kinema Junpo Awards	2014	Best Film of the Year	Runner-up	
Los Angeles Film Critics Association Awards	2013	Best Animated Film	Runner-up	
Mainichi Film Awards	2014	Tsutaya Movie Fan Award – Japanese Film	Won	
Mill Valley Film Festival	2013	Audience Favorite – Animation	Won	
National Board of Review	2013	Best Animated Film	Won	
National Cartoonists Society Division Awards	2014	Feature Animation	Won	
New York Film Critics Circle Awards	2013	Best Animated Film	Won	
New York Film Critics Online Awards	2013	Best Animated Feature	Won	
Online Film Critics Society Awards	2013	Best Animated Feature	Won	
Online Film Critics Society Awards	2013	Best Picture	Nominated	
Online Film Critics Society Awards	2013	Best Director	Nominated	
Online Film Critics Society Awards	2013	Best Foreign Language Film	Nominated	
Online Film Critics Society Awards	2013	Best Adapted Screenplay	Nominated	
San Francisco Film Critics Circle Awards	2013	Best Animated Feature	Nominated	
Satellite Awards	2013	Best Animated or Mixed Media Feature	Won	
Saturn Awards	2015	Best Animated Film	Nominated	
St. Louis Film Critics Association Awards	2013	Best Animated Film	Runner-up	
Tokyo Anime Awards	2014	Grand Prize – Feature Film	Won	
Tokyo Anime Awards	2014	Best Screenplay/Original Work	Won	
Toronto Film Critics Association Awards	2013	Best Animated Film	Won	
Venice Film Festival	2013	Golden Lion	Nominated	
Village Voice Film Poll	2013	Best Animated Feature	Won	
Washington D.C. Area Film Critics Association Awards	2013	Best Animated Feature	Nominated	
Women Film Critics Circle Awards	2013	Best Family Film	Won	

=== The Boy and the Heron ===
The Boy and the Heron premiered on July 14, 2023, and received critical acclaim. It was commercially successful, grossing ¥1.8 billion in its opening weekend, the biggest opening in Studio Ghibli's history.

Award	Year	Category	Result	Ref.
Academy Awards	2024	Best Animated Feature	Won	
Annie Awards	2024	Outstanding Achievement for Storyboarding in a Feature Production	Won	
Annie Awards	2024	Best Animated Feature	Nominated	
Annie Awards	2024	Outstanding Achievement for Directing in a Feature Production	Nominated	
Annie Awards	2024	Outstanding Achievement for Writing in a Feature Production	Nominated	
Astra Film and Creative Arts Awards	2024	Best International Filmmaker	Won	
Astra Film and Creative Arts Awards	2024	Best Animated Feature	Nominated	
Austin Film Critics Association Awards	2024	Best Animated Film	Nominated	
Austin Film Critics Association Awards	2024	Best International Film	Nominated	
Boston Society of Film Critics Awards	2023	Best Animated Film	Won	
British Academy Film Awards	2024	Best Animated Film	Won	
Chicago Film Critics Association Awards	2023	Best Animated Film	Won	
Chicago Film Critics Association Awards	2023	Best Foreign Language Film	Nominated	
Critics' Choice Movie Awards	2024	Best Animated Feature	Nominated	
Dallas–Fort Worth Film Critics Association Awards	2023	Best Animated Film	Won	
Dorian Awards	2024	Animated Film of the Year	Won	
Dorian Awards	2024	Non-English Language Film of the Year	Nominated	
EDA Awards	2024	Best Animated Film	Won	
Florida Film Critics Circle Awards	2023	Best Film	Won	
Florida Film Critics Circle Awards	2023	Best Animated Film	Won	
Florida Film Critics Circle Awards	2023	Best Foreign Language Film	Nominated	
Georgia Film Critics Association Awards	2024	Best Animated Film	Runner-up	
Georgia Film Critics Association Awards	2024	Best International Film	Nominated	
Golden Globe Awards	2024	Best Animated Feature Film	Won	
Houston Film Critics Society Awards	2024	Best Animated Feature	Nominated	
Imagine Film Festival	2023	Silver Scream Award	Won	
International Cinephile Society Awards	2024	Best Animated Film	Won	
International Cinephile Society Awards	2024	Best Picture	15th Place	
Japan Academy Film Prize	2024	Animation of the Year	Won	
London Film Critics' Circle Awards	2024	Animated Film of the Year	Won	
London Film Critics' Circle Awards	2024	Foreign Language Film of the Year	Nominated	
Los Angeles Film Critics Association Awards	2023	Best Animated Film	Won	
Mainichi Film Awards	2024	Ōfuji Noburō Award	Won	
National Board of Review	2023	Top Ten Films	Won (Note: Shared with eight other films)	
New York Film Critics Circle Awards	2023	Best Animated Film	Won	
Online Film Critics Society Awards	2024	Best Animated Film	Won	
San Diego Film Critics Society Awards	2023	Best Animated Film	Won	
San Francisco Bay Area Film Critics Circle Awards	2024	Best Animated Feature	Won	
Satellite Awards	2024	Best Animated or Mixed Media Feature	Won	
Saturn Awards	2025	Best Animated Film	Nominated	
Seattle Film Critics Society Awards	2024	Best Animated Feature	Nominated	
Seattle Film Critics Society Awards	2024	Best International Film	Nominated	
St. Louis Film Critics Association Awards	2023	Best Animated Film	Runner-up	
Toronto Film Critics Association Awards	2023	Best Animated Feature	Runner-up	
Toronto International Film Festival	2023	People's Choice Award	Runner-up	
Washington D.C. Area Film Critics Association Awards	2023	Best Animated Feature	Nominated	

=== Other honours ===
Award / Organization	Year	Category	Work	Result	Ref.
Annie Awards	1998	Winsor McCay Award	—N/a	Won	
Mainichi Film Awards	2002	Ōfuji Noburō Award	Whale Hunt	Won	
Venice Film Festival	2005	Golden Lion for Lifetime Achievement	—N/a	Won	
Comic-Con International	2009	Inkpot Award	—N/a	Won	
Cabinet Office	2012	Person of Cultural Merit	—N/a	Won	
Annie Awards	2013	Writing in an Animated Feature Production	From Up on Poppy Hill	Nominated	
Tokyo Sports Film Awards	2013	Special Award	—N/a	Won	
Governors Awards	2014	Academy Honorary Award	—N/a	Won	
World Fantasy Awards	2019	Life Achievement	—N/a	Won	
Ramon Magsaysay Award Foundation	2024	Ramon Magsaysay Award	—N/a	Won	

== Sources ==
- Abad, Michelle (August 31, 2024). "Studio Ghibli founder Miyazaki Hayao among 2024 Ramon Magsaysay awardees". Rappler. Archived from the original on September 1, 2024.
- Abramovitch, Seth (December 1, 2021). "Hollywood Flashback: 'Spirited Away' Broke Records and Made Oscar History". The Hollywood Reporter. Eldridge Industries. Archived from the original on December 2, 2021.
- "Awards 2003 - 28th Ceremony of the Caesar". César Award. Académie des Arts et Techniques du Cinéma. 2003. Archived from the original on June 6, 2017.
- Adams, Ryan (December 8, 2013). "New York Film Critics Online: Cuaron, Coogler and 12 Years". Awards Daily. Archived from the original on May 22, 2018.
- Adams, Ryan (December 17, 2013). "2013 Village Voice Film Poll". Awards Daily. Archived from the original on December 31, 2015.
- Akimoto, Daisuke (October 1, 2014). Ratelle, Amy (ed.). "A Pig, the State, and War: Porco Rosso (Kurenai no Buta)". Animation Studies. 9. Society for Animation Studies. Archived from the original on January 25, 2018.
- ブルーリボン賞 2001年 (第44回) [Blue Ribbon Award 2001 (44th)]. AllCinema (in Japanese). Stingray Co. Ltd. 2001. Archived from the original on July 19, 2017.
- "2013 EDA Award Winners". Alliance of Women Film Journalists. 2013. Archived from the original on July 31, 2017.
- Amidi, Amid (December 9, 2013). ""The Wind Rises" and "Ernest & Celestine" Win Critic Prizes". Cartoon Brew. Archived from the original on June 15, 2017.
- Anderson, Erik (December 10, 2023). "2023 Washington DC Area Film Critics Association (WAFCA) Winners: 'American Fiction' is Best Feature, 'Oppenheimer' Takes Six". AwardsWatch. Archived from the original on December 10, 2023.
- Anderson, Erik (December 17, 2023). "Toronto Film Critics Association (TFCA) Awards: 'The Zone of Interest' Wins Best Picture, Director". AwardsWatch. Archived from the original on December 17, 2023.
- Anderson, Erik (December 18, 2023). "St. Louis Film Critics Association (StLFCA): 'Oppenheimer' Wins 7 including Best Picture, Director, Actor". AwardsWatch. Archived from the original on December 18, 2023.
- Anderson, Erik (January 5, 2024). "Georgia Film Critics Association (GFCA) Awards: 'Oppenheimer' Tops with Seven Wins". AwardsWatch. Archived from the original on January 5, 2024.
- Anderson, Erik (February 11, 2024). "International Cinephile Society (ICS) Awards: Close Your Eyes Takes Best Picture and Director; All of Us Strangers Wins Actor, Supporting actor, ensemble, Adapted Screenplay". AwardsWatch. Archived from the original on February 11, 2024.
- Anderson, Erik (March 4, 2024). "28th International Press Academy Satellite Awards: 'Oppenheimer,' 'The Holdovers,' 'Poor Things,' 'Maestro' All Earn Wins". AwardsWatch. Archived from the original on March 4, 2024.
- 第7回アニメグランプリ [7th Anime Grand Prix]. Animage (in Japanese). June 1985. Archived from the original on May 23, 2010.
- 第9回アニメグランプリ [9th Anime Grand Prix]. Animage (in Japanese). June 1987. Archived from the original on October 19, 2010.
- 毎日映画コンクール [Everyday Movie Competition]. Animations (in Japanese). 2008. Archived from the original on March 4, 2016.
- "Howl's Moving Castle Gets Honor from Hollywood Fest". Anime News Network. August 16, 2005. Archived from the original on November 30, 2016.
- "Daniel Márquez premiado en Argentina" [Daniel Márquez awarded in Argentina]. Asociación de Productores y Realizadores de Cine del Uruguay (in Spanish). Argentine Film Critics Association. May 5, 2004. Archived from the original on May 22, 2018.
- Avery, Laura, ed. (2006). "Hayao Miyazaki". Newsmakers (2). Gale. ISSN 0899-0417.
- Ball, Ryan (January 6, 2003). "Sweeps off With Online Film Critics Award". Animation Magazine. Archived from the original on June 7, 2024.
- Ball, Ryan (August 25, 2008). "Miyazaki's Ponyo Hits B.O. Milestone". Animation Magazine. Archived from the original on May 22, 2018.
- Barsanti, Sam (March 10, 2024). "Godzilla Minus One crushed everybody at the Japanese Academy Awards". The A.V. Club. G/O Media. Archived from the original on March 10, 2024.
- "Bafta awards 2004: The winners". BBC News. British Broadcasting Corporation. February 15, 2004. Archived from the original on March 12, 2017.
- Blake, Emily (March 4, 2015). "2015 Saturn Awards: 'Captain America: Winter Soldier,' 'Walking Dead' lead nominees". Entertainment Weekly. Dotdash Meredith. Archived from the original on January 17, 2017.
- Bose, Swapnil Dhruv (January 5, 2021). "Hayao Miyazaki: The life and lasting influence of the Studio Ghibli auteur-animator". Far Out Magazine. Archived from the original on January 5, 2021.
- "Awards/Nominations for Howl's Moving Castle". Box Office Prophets. Archived from the original on May 22, 2018.
- "Spirited Away". British Independent Film Awards. October 11, 2003.
- Bruno, Chatelin (October 16, 2002). "Durban Fest Votes Spirited Away". FilmFestivals.com. M21 Entertainment. Archived from the original on May 22, 2018.
- Brzeski, Patrick (December 28, 2020). "'Demon Slayer' Overtakes 'Spirited Away' to Become Japan's Biggest Box Office Hit Ever". The Hollywood Reporter. PMRC. Archived from the original on December 28, 2020.
- Brzeski, Patrick (July 17, 2023). "Box Office: Hayao Miyazaki's 'The Boy and the Heron' Opens Strong in Japan (Despite No Marketing)". The Hollywood Reporter. Eldridge Industries. Archived from the original on July 18, 2023.
- Camp, Brian; Davis, Julie (2007). Anime Classics Zettai!: 100 Most-See Japanese Animation Masterpieces. Berkeley: Stone Bridge Press. ISBN 978-1-9333-3022-8.
- Cavna, Michael (May 25, 2014). "2014 NCS AWARDS: Reuben winner Wiley Miller ('Non Sequitur') appreciates honor's esteemed legacy". The Washington Post. Archived from the original on May 26, 2014.
- "Oscars honors animator Hayao Miyazaki". CBS News. CBS. November 8, 2014. Archived from the original on January 2, 2017.
- "Chicago Film Critics Awards". Chicago Film Critics Association. Archived from the original on February 24, 2010.
- "Jay Chou wins best new performer at HK Film Awards". China Daily. April 8, 2006. Archived from the original on May 2, 2021.
- Chua, Dennis (September 10, 2016). "An other-worldly neighbour". New Straits Times. New Straits Times Press. Archived from the original on January 26, 2018.
- 1986 年度キネマ旬報ベストテン [1986 Kinema Junpo Best Ten]. Cinema 1987 (in Japanese). Archived from the original on June 9, 2017.
- Coates, Tyler (February 26, 2024). "Dorian Film Awards: 'All of Us Strangers' Sweeps Queer Film Critics Honors". The Hollywood Reporter. Penske Media Corporation. Archived from the original on February 26, 2024.
- Dalton, Ben (February 5, 2024). "'The Zone Of Interest', 'All Of Us Strangers' lead London Film Critics' Circle awards". Screen Daily. Media Business Insight. Archived from the original on February 5, 2024.
- Darling, Cary (January 9, 2024). "'Barbie,' 'Oppenheimer' lead Houston Film Critics Society's nominations". Houston Chronicle. Hearst Communications. Archived from the original on January 9, 2024.
- Dams, Tim (December 16, 2003). "London Film Critics unveil Awards contenders". Screen Daily. Screen International. Archived from the original on June 8, 2024.
- Davis, Clayton (November 30, 2023). "New York Film Critics Awards: 'Killers of the Flower Moon' Wins Best Film, Christopher Nolan Takes Director (Full List)". Variety. Penske Media Corporation. Archived from the original on November 30, 2023.
- Davis, Clayton (December 10, 2023). "'The Zone of Interest' Wins Best Picture at Los Angeles Film Critics Awards, Four Women Take Acting Prizes (Full Winners List)". Variety. Penske Media Corporation. Archived from the original on December 10, 2023.
- Davis, Clayton (December 6, 2023). "'Killers of the Flower Moon' Named Best Picture by National Board of Review, Lily Gladstone and Paul Giamatti Nab Top Acting Honors". Variety. Penske Media Corporation. Archived from the original on December 7, 2023.
- Dietz, Jason (January 3, 2010). "Critics Pick the Best Movies of the Decade". Metacritic. CBS Interactive. Archived from the original on April 28, 2017.
- Ebert, Roger (October 24, 1999). "Director Miyazaki draws American attention". Chicago Sun-Times. Sun-Times Media Group. Archived from the original on January 31, 2018.
- Edmunds, Marlene (October 21, 2002). "'Bird,' 'Spirited' nab kid kudos". Variety. Penske Media Corporation. Archived from the original on November 22, 2015.
- Egan, Toussaint (June 25, 2017). "Hayao Miyazaki's Legacy Is Far Greater Than His Films". Paste. Paste Media Group. Archived from the original on January 10, 2021.
- Feinberg, Scott (January 6, 2014). "New York Film Critics Circle Awards: Steve McQueen". The Hollywood Reporter. Eldridge Industries. Archived from the original on April 22, 2017.
- Feinberg, Scott (January 7, 2024). "Astra Film Awards: 'Barbie' Wins Eight Awards, Including Best Picture". The Hollywood Reporter. Eldridge Industries. Archived from the original on January 8, 2024.
- "Europejska Akademia Filmowa 2002" [European Film Academy 2002] (in Polish). Filmweb. 2002. Archived from the original on August 15, 2017.
- "Awards Archive". Film Critics Circle of Australia. Archived from the original on July 5, 2017.
- Flores, Terry (January 11, 2024). "Netflix's 'Nimona' Leads Annie Awards 2024 Nominations". Variety. Penske Media Corporation. Archived from the original on January 11, 2024.
- "Oppenheimer, Killers of the Flower Moon, May December lead pack with most nominations". Florida Film Critics Circle. December 13, 2023. Archived from the original on December 13, 2023.
- Gaulène, Mathieu (April 4, 2011). "Studio Ghibli, A New Force in Animation". INA Global. National Audiovisual Institute. Archived from the original on October 28, 2016.
- Giardina, Carolyn (January 7, 2024). "Hayao Miyazaki Wins First Golden Globe for 'The Boy and the Heron'". The Hollywood Reporter. Eldridge Industries. Archived from the original on January 8, 2024.
- Godfrey, Leigh (January 22, 2003). "Gollum and Spirited Away Are The Critics Choice". Animation World Network. Archived from the original on June 23, 2019.
- Gordon, Tim (December 9, 2013). "D.C.'s Critics Find Much to Praise Across Time and Space". Washington D.C. Area Film Critics Association. Archived from the original on September 14, 2017.
- Green, Jennifer (September 5, 2002). "Sitges reveals full competition line-up". Screen Daily. Screen International. Archived from the original on September 24, 2009.
- Green, Scott (March 11, 2014). ""The Wind Rises" Takes Animation Prize at Japan Academy Awards". Crunchyroll. Ellation. Archived from the original on January 21, 2017.
- Grein, Paul (January 7, 2024). "A 'Barbie' Song Won at 2024 Astra Film Awards, But It Wasn't the Billie Eilish Hit". Billboard. Eldridge Industries. Archived from the original on January 7, 2024.
- Hairston, Marc (November 1998). "Kiki's Delivery Service". University of Texas at Dallas. Archived from the original on August 20, 2007.
- Hazra, Adriana (January 7, 2024). "The Boy and the Heron, The Super Mario Bros. Movie Makes BAFTA Award Longlist". Anime News Network. Kadokawa Corporation. Archived from the original on January 7, 2024.
- Heller, Scott (December 16, 2002). "Boston film critics pick 'The Pianist'". The Boston Globe. p. 29. Archived from the original on June 7, 2024 – via Newspapers.com.
- Hernandez, Eugene (June 13, 2005). ""Swimmers," "True Story," and Khrzhanovsky Win Top Awards at Seattle International Fest". IndieWire. Penske Media Corporation. Archived from the original on August 10, 2023.
- Hipes, Patrick (February 17, 2024). "Annie Awards: 'Spider-Man: Across The Spider-Verse' Takes Best Feature And Tops Winners List; 'Blue Eye Samurai' Dominates TV". Deadline Hollywood. Penske Media Corporation. Archived from the original on February 18, 2024.
- Hipes, Patrick (December 5, 2024). "'Dune: Part Two', 'Fallout' Lead Saturn Awards Nominations". Deadline Hollywood. Penske Media Corporation. Archived from the original on December 5, 2024.
- 西村雅彦 伊丹十三監督の死に涙 [Masahiko Nishimura sheds tears over the death of director Juzo Itami]. Hochi Shimbun (in Japanese). December 26, 1997. Archived from the original on March 6, 2012.
- 「主演男優はぼく」役所広司 史上初の2年連続受賞 ["I'm the Best Actor" Yakusho Koji becomes the first man in history to win the award for two consecutive years]. Hochi Shimbun (in Japanese). February 12, 1998. Archived from the original on February 19, 2012.
- Hodgkins, Crystalyn (December 13, 2013). "The Wind Rises Earns Golden Globe Nomination for Best Foreign Language Film". Anime News Network. Archived from the original on May 29, 2017.
- Hodgkins, Crystalyn (December 13, 2022). "Hayao Miyazaki's How Do You Live? Film Opens in Japan on July 14, 2023". Anime News Network. Archived from the original on December 13, 2022.
- Hodgkins, Crystalyn (January 19, 2024). "Maboroshi, The Boy and the Heron, Godzilla Minus One Win at Mainichi Film Awards". Anime News Network. Archived from the original on January 20, 2024.
- "第二十一屆香港電影金像獎獎名單" [The 21st Hong Kong Film Awards Winners List] (in Chinese). Hong Kong Film Awards. 2002. Archived from the original on August 8, 2002.
- "第29屆香港電影金像獎提名及得獎名單" [The 29th Hong Kong Film Awards Nominees and Award Winners] (in Chinese). Hong Kong Film Awards. 2010. Archived from the original on June 13, 2017.
- Howe, Michael (April 15, 2003). "The Making of Hayao Miyazaki's "Spirited Away" -- Part 2". Jim Hill Media. Archived from the original on September 3, 2018.
- Howe, Michael (April 20, 2003). "The Making of Hayao Miyazaki's "Spirited Away" -- Part 5". Jim Hill Media. Archived from the original on November 19, 2016.
- "2003 Hugo Awards". Hugo Awards. 2003. Archived from the original on May 27, 2017.
- "'Inside Llewyn Davis,' 'Blue Is The Warmest Color' Top 2014 International Cinephile Society Awards". IndieWire. Penske Media Corporation. February 25, 2014. Archived from the original on January 28, 2024.
- "26th Annual Annie". Annie Award. International Animated Film Association. 1998. Archived from the original on April 23, 2017.
- "28th Annual Annie". Annie Award. International Animated Film Association. 2000. Archived from the original on April 25, 2017.
- "33rd Annual Annie Nominations and Awards Recipients". Annie Award. International Animated Film Association. 2006. Archived from the original on April 21, 2017.
- "Watch the 40th Annual Annie Awards Show". Annie Award. International Animated Film Association. 2013. Archived from the original on December 11, 2016.
- "IHG Award Recipients". International Horror Guild. Archived from the original on March 31, 2017.
- "Motion Picture Nominees and Winners". International Press Academy. 2003. Archived from the original on January 17, 2003.
- 第13回日本アカデミー賞 [The 13th Japan Academy Awards] (in Japanese). Japan Academy Film Prize. 1990. Archived from the original on January 20, 2010.
- "1997 Japan Media Arts Festival Animation Division Grand Prize Princess Mononoke". Japan Media Arts Festival. 1997. Archived from the original on December 18, 2007.
- "Grand Prize - Spirited Away | Award | Animation Division | 2001 [5th] Japan Media Arts Festival Archive". Japan Media Arts Festival. 2001. Archived from the original on July 10, 2015.
- "Excellence Award - Howl's Moving Castle | Award | Animation Division | 2004 [8th] Japan Media Arts Festival Archive". Japan Media Arts Festival. 2004. Archived from the original on February 4, 2022.
- "'Howl's Moving Castle' conjures up box-office record". The Japan Times. Nifco. November 24, 2004. Archived from the original on January 8, 2019.
- "Miyazaki wins Annie Award for 'Kaze Tachinu' screenplay". The Japan Times. Nifco. February 2, 2014. Archived from the original on September 17, 2014.
- Jevens, Darel (December 13, 2023). "Chicago critics name 'Killers of the Flower Moon' the year's best film". Chicago Sun-Times. Chicago Public Media. Archived from the original on December 13, 2023.
- Jorgenson, Todd (December 16, 2013). "DFW Film Critics name "12 Years a Slave" as top film of 2013". Dallas–Fort Worth Film Critics Association. Archived from the original on May 22, 2018.
- Kanō, Seiji (2006). 宮崎駿全書 [The Complete Miyazaki Hayao] (in Japanese) (2nd ed.). Tokyo: Film Art Inc. pp. 34–73, 323. ISBN 978-4-8459-0687-1.
- Karten, Harvey S. (December 14, 2013). "2002 NYFCO Film Awards". New York Film Critics Online. Archived from the original on February 28, 2015.
- Keegan, Rebecca (August 15, 2013). "'The Wind Rises': Hayao Miyazaki's new film stirs controversy". Los Angeles Times. Archived from the original on April 13, 2017.
- Kelly, Paul, ed. (2019). The International Who's Who. Vol. 2. Routledge. ISBN 978-0-367-27815-1.
- Kelly, Stephen (July 14, 2022). "Princess Mononoke: The masterpiece that flummoxed the US". BBC. Archived from the original on July 13, 2022.
- Keslassy, Erik (February 14, 2024). "Close Your Eyes, All of Us Strangers, Anatomy of a Fall' Top ICS Awards". Variety. Penske Media Corporation. Archived from the original on February 14, 2024.
- キネマ旬報 ベスト・テン [Kinema Junpo Best Ten]. Kinenote (in Japanese). 1984. Archived from the original on January 12, 2015.
- キネマ旬報 ベスト・テン [Kinema Junpo Best Ten]. Kinenote (in Japanese). 1988. Archived from the original on January 17, 2015.
- キネマ旬報 ベスト・テン [Kinema Junpo Best Ten]. Kinenote (in Japanese). 1989. Archived from the original on January 17, 2015.
- キネマ旬報 ベスト・テン [Kinema Junpo Best Ten]. Kinenote (in Japanese). 1992. Archived from the original on January 17, 2015.
- キネマ旬報 ベスト・テン [Kinema Junpo Best Ten]. Kinenote (in Japanese). 1997. Archived from the original on January 10, 2015.
- キネマ旬報 ベスト・テン [Kinema Junpo Best Ten]. Kinenote (in Japanese). 2001. Archived from the original on January 17, 2015.
- King, Susan (December 5, 2002). "'The Hours' earns season's first nod". Los Angeles Times. Archived from the original on June 7, 2024.
- King, Susan (December 15, 2002). "L.A. Film Critics Pick 'Schmidt' as Year's Best Film". Los Angeles Times. Archived from the original on September 4, 2020.
- Komatsu, Mikikazu (October 30, 2012). "Hayao Miyazaki Named Person of Cultural Merit by Japanese Government". Crunchyroll. Otter Media. Archived from the original on May 22, 2018.
- Komatsu, Mikikazu (February 2, 2017). "Kinema Junpo Readers Also Pick "In This Corner of the World" as Best Japanese Film of 2016". Crunchyroll. Otter Media. Archived from the original on June 8, 2017.
- Koulikov, Mikhail (March 24, 2009). "Ponyo's Joe Hisaishi Wins at Asia Film Awards". Anime News Network. Archived from the original on July 29, 2017.
- Lacey, Liam (December 17, 2013). "Toronto film critics name Coen brothers movie the best of 2013". The Globe and Mail. The Woodbridge Company. Archived from the original on December 18, 2013.
- Landreth, Jonathan (January 30, 2009). "Japanese films soar at home in 2008". The Hollywood Reporter. Eldridge Industries. Archived from the original on April 28, 2017.
- Lang, Brett (September 17, 2023). "Cord Jefferson's 'American Fiction' Wins Toronto Film Festival Audience Award". Variety. Penske Media Corporation. Archived from the original on September 18, 2023.
- Lenburg, Jeff (2012). Hayao Miyazaki: Japan's Premier Anime Storyteller. New York City: Infobase Publishing. ISBN 978-1-60413-841-2.
- Lewis, Hilary (December 4, 2013). "'Her' Named Best Film by National Board of Review". The Hollywood Reporter. Eldridge Industries. Archived from the original on July 4, 2017.
- "The Locus Index to SF Awards: 2004 Nebula Awards". Locus. 2011. Archived from the original on July 13, 2011.
- "The Locus Index to SF Awards: 2007 Nebula Awards". Locus. 2011. Archived from the original on June 5, 2011.
- Lodge, Guy (December 13, 2013). "'12 Years a Slave' leads San Francisco Film Critics Circle nods". Uproxx. Woven Digital. Archived from the original on August 6, 2017.
- Lodge, Guy (January 6, 2014). "2013 Georgia Film Critics' Association nominations". HitFix. Woven Digital. Archived from the original on January 7, 2014.
- Loo, Egan (February 23, 2009). "Ponyo, DMC Won Japan Academy Awards on Friday". Anime News Network. Archived from the original on January 26, 2017.
- Loo, Egan (December 2, 2009). "Ponyo's Miyazaki, Hisaishi Nominated for Annie Awards". Anime News Network. Archived from the original on June 9, 2017.
- Loo, Egan (September 8, 2013). "Miyazaki's The Wind Rises Does Not Win Awards at Venice". Anime News Network. Archived from the original on August 4, 2017.
- Loo, Egan (March 23, 2014). "The Wind Rises, Attack on Titan Win at Tokyo Anime Award Festival". Anime News Network. Archived from the original on March 25, 2014.
- Loveridge, Lynzee (December 5, 2013). "Miyazaki's The Wind Rises Nominated for Satellite Awards". Anime News Network. Archived from the original on August 4, 2017.
- Loveridge, Lynzee (December 10, 2013). "Miyazaki's The Wind Rises Wins Boston Film Society Award". Anime News Network. Archived from the original on June 24, 2017.
- Loveridge, Lynzee (December 17, 2013). "The Wind Rises Nominated For Chicago Critics & Critics' Choice Awards". Anime News Network. Archived from the original on July 29, 2017.
- Loveridge, Lynzee (January 17, 2014). "Miyazaki's The Wind Rises Nominated for Animated Film Oscar (Updated)". Anime News Network. Archived from the original on June 23, 2017.
- Loy, David; Goodhew, Linda (February 2004). "The Dharma of Miyazaki Hayao: Revenge vs. Compassion in Nausicaa and Mononoke". 文教大学国際学部紀要 Journal of the Faculty of International Studies. 14 (2). Bunkyo University: 67–75.
- Ma, Kevin (January 1, 2014). "The Wind Rises tops 2013 Japan B.O." Film Business Asia. Archived from the original on January 2, 2014.
- Macdonald, Christopher (January 21, 2003). "Spirited Away Wins Critics Choice Award". Anime News Network. Archived from the original on March 11, 2007.
- Macdonald, Christopher (May 22, 2003). "Spirited Away wins Saturn". Anime News Network. Archived from the original on August 25, 2014.
- Macdonald, Christopher (September 11, 2004). "No Golden Lion for Howl". Anime News Network. Archived from the original on August 8, 2023.
- Macdonald, Christopher (January 24, 2005). "2004 Mainichi Film Awards". Anime News Network. Archived from the original on April 22, 2007.
- Macdonald, Christopher (February 22, 2006). "Howl Nominated for Saturn Award". Anime News Network. Archived from the original on October 29, 2016.
- 毎日映画コンクール 第56回（2001年） [Everyday Movie Competition No. 56 (2001)]. Mainichi Shimbun (in Japanese). 2001. Archived from the original on January 11, 2017.
- 毎日映画コンクール 第52回（1997年） [Mainichi Film Awards 52nd (1997)]. Mainichi Shimbun (in Japanese). 1997. Archived from the original on January 9, 2018.
- Martin, Peter (December 18, 2023). "THE HOLDOVERS Named Best Film of 2023 by Dallas Critics". Screen Anarchy. Archived from the original on December 19, 2023.
- McCarthy, Helen (1999). Hayao Miyazaki: Master of Japanese Animation (2002 ed.). Berkeley: Stone Bridge Press. ISBN 978-1-8806-5641-9.
- McCarthy, Helen (2019). "Teenage Wildlife: Princess Mononoke and Hayao Miyazaki's Theory of the Feminine". In Denison, Rayna (ed.). Princess Mononoke: Understanding Studio Ghibli's Monster Princess. Bloomsbury Academic. pp. 97–114. doi:10.5040/9781501329753.ch-005. ISBN 978-1-5013-2976-0.
- McCullough, Hayley (November 7, 2022). "Howl's Moving Castle Fan Beautifully Cosplays Sophie in Handmade Dress". Comic Book Resources. Valnet. Archived from the original on November 7, 2022.
- "The Boy and the Heron". Metacritic. Fandom Inc. Archived from the original on January 3, 2024.
- "MVFF36 Audience Favorites". Mill Valley Film Festival. Archived from the original on February 19, 2014.
- Miyazaki, Hayao (2009). Turning Point, 1997–2008. Translated by Cary, Beth; Schodt, Frederik L. (2014 ed.). San Francisco: Viz Media. ISBN 978-1-4215-6090-8.
- Morgan, David (November 8, 2014). "Oscars honors animator Hayao Miyazaki". CBS News. CBS. Archived from the original on January 2, 2017.
- "Spirited Away". Nebula Awards. Science Fiction and Fantasy Writers of America. 2003. Archived from the original on May 22, 2018.
- Neglia, Matt (December 19, 2023). "The 2023 San Diego Film Critics Society (SDFCS) Winners". Next Best Picture. Archived from the original on December 20, 2023.
- Neglia, Matt (January 3, 2024). "The 2023 Seattle Film Critics Society (SFCS) Nominations". Next Best Picture. Archived from the original on January 3, 2024.
- Neglia, Matt (January 5, 2024). "The 2023 Georgia Film Critics Association (GAFCA) Winners". Next Best Picture. Archived from the original on January 5, 2024.
- Neglia, Matt (January 22, 2024). "The 2023 Online Film Critics society (OFCS) Winners". Next Best Picture. Archived from the original on January 22, 2024.
- もののけ姫！記録ずくめで2冠！ [Princess Mononoke! A double crown with numerous records!]. Nikkan Sports (in Japanese). 1997. Archived from the original on February 5, 1998.
- 窪塚洋介、裕次郎さんのパワー受け継ぐ！ [Yosuke Kubozuka inherits Yujiro's power!]. Nikkan Sports (in Japanese). 2001. Archived from the original on February 4, 2002.
- 邦画1位に「ペコロス」 キネマ旬報ベストテン [Pecoross ranked first in Kinema Junpo's top ten Japanese movies]. The Nikkei (in Japanese). January 9, 2014. Archived from the original on October 31, 2023.
- Noviana, Fajria (2020). "Moral Values in Hayao Miyazaki's Spirited Away: A Sociology of Literature Approach". Humanika. 27 (1). Diponegoro University: 23–32. doi:10.14710/humanika.v27i1.30548. ISSN 2502-5783.
- "2009 Awards (13th Annual)". Online Film Critics Society. 2010. Archived from the original on June 2, 2017.
- "The Online Film Critics Society Announces 17th Annual Awards". Online Film Critics Society. December 9, 2013. Archived from the original on June 2, 2017.
- Osaki, Tomohiro (September 6, 2013). "Miyazaki vows he won't be idle in retirement". The Japan Times. Nifco. Archived from the original on January 21, 2016.
- Pangilinan, Michelle, ed. (March 2013). The Art of My Neighbor Totoro. Viz Media. ISBN 978-1-5911-6698-6.
- Persall, Steve (January 3, 2003). "State critics like 'Adaptation'". Tampa Bay Times. Times Publishing Company. p. 23. Archived from the original on June 7, 2024 – via Newspapers.com.
- Phillips, Jevon (March 6, 2003). "'Towers,' 'Report' top Saturn nominees". Variety. Penske Media Corporation. Archived from the original on September 23, 2021.
- Philpot, Robert (January 7, 2003). "'Chicago' dazzles area film critics". Fort Worth Star-Telegram. McClatchy. p. 9. Archived from the original on June 7, 2024 – via Newspapers.com.
- Pond, Steve (December 8, 2013). "2013 Critics' Awards Winners: The Complete List – Utah, Nevada, Florida (Updated)". TheWrap. Archived from the original on December 11, 2013.
- Pulver, Andrew (March 11, 2024). "The Boy and the Heron, Hayao Miyazaki's last film, wins Oscar for best animation". The Guardian. Archived from the original on March 10, 2024.
- Ramachandran, Naman (December 20, 2023). "'All of Us Strangers, 'Oppenheimer' Lead London Critics' Circle Awards Nominations". Variety. Penske Media Corporation. Archived from the original on December 20, 2023.
- Reinders, Eric (October 14, 2016). The Moral Narratives of Hayao Miyazaki. Jefferson, NC: McFarland & Company. ISBN 978-1-4766-6452-1.
- Rich, Katey (December 13, 2023). "Critics Choice Awards 2024: See the Full List of Nominations". Vanity Fair. Condé Nast. Archived from the original on December 13, 2023.
- Romano, Andrew (November 15, 2013). "Hayao Miyazaki's 'The Wind Rises': An Anime Icon Bows Out". The Daily Beast. IAC. Archived from the original on December 7, 2016.
- Rowe, Peter (July 25, 2009). "Miyazaki's 'Ponyo' is quite a draw". The San Diego Union-Tribune. Platinum Equity. Archived from the original on September 18, 2018.
- "Bay Area critics pick 'Oppenheimer' as best picture, Robert Downey Jr. as best supporting actor". San Francisco Chronicle. Hearst Communications. January 9, 2024. Archived from the original on January 10, 2024.
- "Sci-fi, horror nominees". San Francisco Examiner. Hollywood. United Press International. February 5, 1981. p. 62. Archived from the original on March 12, 2025 – via Newspapers.com.
- Schellhase, Peter (November 7, 2014). "The Conservative Vision of Hayao Miyazaki". The Imaginative Conservative. Archived from the original on June 1, 2017.
- Schilling, Mark (February 20, 2009). "Miyazaki's 'Ponyo' tops anime awards". Variety. Penske Media Corporation. Archived from the original on May 22, 2018.
- Schwartz, Ronald (2008). Great Spanish Films Since 1950. Lanham, MD: Scarecrow Press. ISBN 978-0-8108-5405-5.
- "Spirited Away wins Cambridge audience prize". Screen Daily. Screen International. July 22, 2003. Archived from the original on May 22, 2018.
- 邦画「風立ちぬ」&外国映画「テッド」が映画ファン賞 [Movie Fan Awards for Japanese film The Wind Rises and foreign film Ted ]. Sports Nippon (in Japanese). January 21, 2014. Archived from the original on April 6, 2023.
- Stephens, Kim (November 12, 2013). "Queensland film nominated for Asia Pacific Screen Award". Brisbane Times. Fairfax Media. Archived from the original on May 22, 2018.
- Sudo, Yoko (June 4, 2014). "'Frozen' Ranks as Third-Biggest Hit in Japan". The Wall Street Journal. Dow Jones & Company. Archived from the original on February 6, 2017.
- Talbot, Margaret (January 17, 2005). "The Auteur of Anime". The New Yorker. Vol. 80, no. 43. New York City: Condé Nast. pp. 64–75.
- Tallerico, Brian (December 8, 2023). "Killers of the Flower Moon, Oppenheimer, Poor Things Lead CFCA Nominations". RogerEbert.com. Archived from the original on December 8, 2023.
- Tangcay, Jazz; Thompson, Jaden; Wu, Valerie (January 5, 2024). "2024 Sundance Film Festival Announces Beyond Film Lineup – Film News in Brief". Variety. Penske Media Corporation. Archived from the original on January 3, 2024.
- Tapley, Kristopher (December 8, 2013). "2013 Houston Film Critics Society nominations". HitFix. Woven Digital. Archived from the original on December 21, 2013.
- 東スポ映画大賞 [Tokyo Sports Film Award]. Tokyo Sports (in Japanese). Archived from the original on March 28, 2014.
- "Ponyo (8+)". Transilvania International Film Festival. Archived from the original on July 18, 2017.
- "'12 Years a Slave,' 'Nebraska' and 'Her' lead the way with St. Louis critics nominations". Uproxx. Woven Digital. December 9, 2013. Archived from the original on July 29, 2017.
- "'12 Years a Slave' tops with Florida film critics". Uproxx. Woven Digital. December 18, 2013. Archived from the original on March 7, 2021.
- "'12 Years a Slave' Dominates Online Film Critics Society Awards". Variety. Penske Media Corporation. December 16, 2013.
- Vijn, Ard (November 26, 2023). "Imagine 2023: What The Audiences Liked Best". Screen Anarchy. Archived from the original on December 1, 2023.
- Vivarelli, Nick (February 9, 2005). "Venice draws Miyazaki". Variety. Penske Media Corporation. Archived from the original on October 3, 2015.
- "2009 WAFCA Awards". Washington D.C. Area Film Critics Association. December 7, 2009. Archived from the original on September 14, 2017.
- Wong, Tessa (December 3, 2016). "Hayao Miyazaki: Japan's godfather of animation?". BBC. Archived from the original on December 3, 2016.
- "World Fantasy Awards 2019". World Fantasy Convention. Archived from the original on November 4, 2019.
- Wellham, Melissa (November 28, 2016). "'Your Name' + 5 Oscar nominated Japanese anime films". Special Broadcasting Service. Archived from the original on April 22, 2017.
- West, Hadley (December 13, 2022). "The Most Award-Winning Anime Films and Series of All Time". MovieWeb. Valnet. Archived from the original on December 19, 2022.
- Westhoff, Jeffrey (January 9, 2003). "'Heaven-sent'". Northwest Herald. Shaw Media. p. 34. Archived from the original on June 7, 2024 – via Newspapers.com.
- Whittaker, Richard (January 3, 2024). "Austin Film Critics Association Announces 2023 Award Nominees". The Austin Chronicle. Archived from the original on January 4, 2024.
- Youngs, Ian (February 18, 2024). "Oppenheimer's Cillian Murphy and Robert Downey Jr scoop Bafta Film Awards". BBC News. BBC. Archived from the original on February 19, 2024.
