= Evacuations of civilians in Japan during World War II =

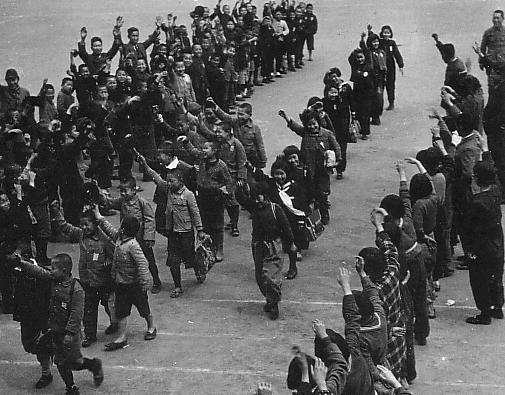
Schoolchildren being evacuated in August, 1944

About 8.5 million Japanese civilians were displaced from their homes between 1943 and 1945 as a result of air raids on Japan by the United States Army Air Forces (USAAF) during the Pacific War. These evacuations started in December 1943 as a voluntary government program to prepare the country's main cities for bombing raids by evacuating children, women and the elderly to rural towns. After American bombers started to devastate entire cities in 1945, millions more civilians fled to the countryside.

== Background ==
Before the Pacific War and during the first years of this conflict, the Japanese government placed little emphasis on preparing civil defense measures in the event of air raids on the country. The guidance which was prepared for civilians called on them to remain in cities which were attacked to fight fires from incendiary raids as part of neighborhood associations.

The series of defeats suffered by the Japanese military during the second half of 1942 and 1943 led to the introduction of policies designed to protect civilians from air attacks. These measures anticipated the commencement of attacks on the Japanese home islands if the Mariana Islands were captured by the United States. In late 1943 the government of Japan developed plans to evacuate non-essential personnel from Tokyo, Nagoya, Osaka and the cities in northern Kyushu. Prime Minister Hideki Tōjō initially opposed implementing these plans due to the damage they were likely to cause to morale and family cohesion but eventually agreed in order to minimize civilian casualties. The Japanese Cabinet formally decided to begin evacuations on 15 October 1943.

== Evacuations ==
The government launched a voluntary evacuation program in December 1943, encouraging the elderly, children, and their mothers to stay in the homes of friends and relatives in rural areas. The government provided civilians with little assistance to evacuate, however. Few people evacuated until the first raid by American heavy bombers on Japan, an attack on Yawata, in June 1944 after which the government urged families to evacuate their children. As a result, 459,000 children and their parents moved to stay with friends and relatives. For families without contacts in the countryside, entire school classes evacuated as groups accompanied by their teachers; by August 1944, 333,000 children had been relocated to rural areas where they continued their education in inns, temples and other public buildings. A further 343,000 urban residents were forced to leave their homes after they were demolished to create firebreaks; these people either moved to the country or lived in temporary accommodation near their workplace.

The number of evacuees increased greatly in 1945; historian Thomas Havens has written that the movement of Japanese civilians from cities in the last months of the war was "one of history's great migrations". Following the firebombing of Tokyo on 9–10 March 1945, all schoolchildren in the third to sixth grades were required to leave the main cities, and 87 percent of them had been moved to the countryside by early April. As the American firebombing campaign continued millions more Japanese civilians fled from their homes into rural areas, overwhelming the government's evacuation plans. By June 1945 millions of Japanese civilians had been rendered homeless by air raids and the evacuation of survivors meant that many of the remaining factories were unable to find sufficient workers. Between June and August 1945 American bombers dropped propaganda leaflets over several Japanese cities warning that they would be bombed and urging civilians to evacuate; these persuaded many residents of the cities to leave and reduced public confidence in the Japanese Army while also convincing civilians that the Americans were attempting to minimize casualties. Overall, 8.5 million Japanese civilians were displaced as a result of the American raids, including 120,000 of Hiroshima's population of 365,000 who evacuated the city before the atomic bomb attack on it in August 1945.

=== Challenges to evacuated students ===
Once the students were evacuated to the countryside, or at least to towns outside of the larger and more industrialized cities, many students went to work in factories where unskilled labor was needed under the official "Labor Mobilization Policy" and "Student Mobilization Policy". In most cases students were genuine volunteers who petitioned their teachers and school principals as a group to allow them to work in factory complexes that could accept them. Students then entered dorms near the factory complex; strict daily schedules ensured that the children woke, cleaned their quarters, ate meals, went to and from their work shifts, and had time for evening hygiene in cohorts. Parents were reluctant to protest because it was believed that the military-funded factories could provide the children with more nourishing meals and because such protests would draw the attention of the secret police and suspicions of disloyalty or subversion.

From the summer of 1944 until February 1945, high school girls worked in or near Kokura constructing balloons to carry bombs across the Pacific where they would detonate in the U.S. The girls worked in two 12-hour shifts and, contrary to their expectations, there was little food available. Some eventually suffered from malnutrition. Within a short time after graduation in the spring of 1945, one participant estimates that one-tenth of her classmates died, while others suffered from tuberculosis, neuralgia, rickets, and symptoms of over-exhaustion as a result of exposure to chemicals used in making the balloons.

Other challenges met those children who were too young to work in factories or were evacuated to areas where there were no factories that could accept student laborers. The demands by the military and a strict rationing system meant that even in the countryside food was scarce. Transitioning from inner cities to quiet, bucolic towns meant that the children were struck with a sense of alienation as they faced an unfamiliar environment, the growing resentment of their host families, and ridicule from local children when it came to the difference in accents or ignorance concerning agricultural tasks. One teacher who was evacuated with his students in 1945 kept a diary and noted the gradual shift in daily activities from education to agriculture to gathering activities. By the summer, students were even preparing for the eventual Allied invasion of Japan by training to fight with bamboo spears and throwing rocks at targets. The students spent part of each day cultivating gardens and some days they were sent out to forage for things such as wisteria bark and bamboo shoots or bark; on other days they made charcoal and carried it from a distant mountain; classroom assignments included writing letters to soldiers at the front.

== Post-war ==
Once the war ended, every effort was made to inform the children how many of their family members had been lost in the air raids. Parents began to make their way to the country towns and retrieve the children. Those families that had lost one parent or lost the family home took longer, sometimes weeks, before they could locate the waiting child. For children who had lost both parents and all siblings, it could take months before a cousin or an uncle could be found who was willing to take in the child. Orphans, like displaced veterans, became an issue of social welfare and a visible symbol of defeat in the post-war period.

== Cultural references ==
In 1967, a semi-autobiographical novel by Akiyuki Nosaka was published called A Grave of Fireflies (火垂るの墓, Hotaru no Haka). The story was based on his experiences during the Kobe air raid in 1945 and afterward as an evacuee. The award-winning book was made into the critically acclaimed anime film Grave of the Fireflies, directed by Isao Takahata and released in Japan in 1988. In the film, a boy and his younger sister must go to live with relatives in the countryside. Their aunt turns increasingly hostile until the children feel compelled to leave. They have a difficult time finding food and begin to suffer from malnutrition. The film is fairly graphic, and the struggles of the children tend to provoke a powerful emotional response from viewers. Grave of the Fireflies is distributed internationally on DVD. The story was later adapted to two live-action movies televised in Japan in 2005 and in 2008. The 2005 film portrayed the story from the perspective of the children's cousin, a minor character in the anime film.

== See also ==
- Evacuations of civilians in Britain during World War II
- Evacuations of children in Germany during World War II
- Flight and evacuation of German civilians during the end of World War II
- List of mass evacuations

== Bibliography ==
- Arnold, Bruce Makoto (2013). "Materiel Matters: The Japanese State's Evacuation of Elementary Schoolchildren During The Second World War". Anistoriton Journal. 13.
- Cook, Haruko Taya; Cook, Theodore F., eds. (1993). Japan at War: An Oral History. New Press.
- Craven, Wesley; Cate, James, eds. (1953). The Pacific: Matterhorn to Nagasaki (PDF). The Army Air Forces in World War II. Vol. Five. Washington, DC: Office of Air Force History. Archived from the original (PDF) on 22 July 2011.
- Daniels, Gordon (31 December 1981). "Before Hiroshima: The Bombing of Japan 1944–45". History Today. 32 (1).
- Dear, I.C.B; Foot, M.R.D., eds. (2005). The Oxford Companion to World War II. Oxford University Press. ISBN 978-0-19-280670-3.
- Dower, John W. (1999). Embracing Defeat: Japan in the Wake of World War II. NYC: W.W. Norton and Co. ISBN 0-393-32027-8.
- Hashimoto, Yukio (1995). "Fighter Planes and Dustpans". In Gibney, Frank (ed.). Senso: The Japanese Remember the Pacific War: Letters to the Editor of Asahi Shimbun. Beth Cary (trans.). Armonk, NY: M.E. Sharpe. p. 181.
- Havens, Thomas R.H. (1978). Valley of Darkness : The Japanese People and World War Two. New York: Norton. ISBN 0-393-05656-2.
- Kerr, E. Bartlett (1991). Flames Over Tokyo: The U.S. Army Air Forces' Incendiary Campaign Against Japan 1944–1945. New York City: Donald I. Fine Inc. ISBN 1-55611-301-3.
- Kondo, Tsuneji (1977). 学徒動員と豊川海軍工廠 [Student Mobilization and the Toyokawa Naval Arsenal] (in Japanese). Toyokawa, Japan: Toyokawa Cultural Assets Association.
- Ohnuki-Tierney, Emiko (2002). Kamikaze, Cherry Blossoms, and Nationalisms: The Militarization of Aesthetics in Japanese History. Chicago: University of Chicago Press. p. 15.
- Shimizu, Mitsuo (1995). "Pupils' War Experience Noted in My Diary". In Gibney, Frank (ed.). Senso: The Japanese Remember the Pacific War: Letters to the Editor of Asahi Shimbun. Translated by Cary, Beth. M.E. Sharpe. pp. 186–188. ISBN 978-1-317-45997-2.
- Szasz, Ferenc Morton (2009). ""Pamphlets Away": The Allied Propaganda Campaign Over Japan During the Last Months of World War II". The Journal of Popular Culture. 42 (3): 530–540. doi:10.1111/j.1540-5931.2009.00694.x.
- Takamizawa, Sachiko (1995). "When I Made Balloon Bombs". In Gibney, Frank (ed.). Senso: The Japanese Remember the Pacific War: Letters to the Editor of Asahi Shimbun. Translated by Cary, Beth. M.E. Sharpe. pp. 181–182. ISBN 978-1-317-45997-2.
- Tanaka, Tetsuko (1993). "Making Balloon Bombs". In Cook, Haruko Taya; Cook, Theodore F. (eds.). Japan at War: An Oral History. New York: New Press. pp. 187–192. ISBN 1-56584-039-9.
