= Grave of the Fireflies (2005 film) =

2005 television film

- Live-action version of Grave of the Fireflies
- Based on: Grave of the Fireflies by Akiyuki Nosaka
- Screenplay by: Yumiko Inoue
- Directed by: Tōya Satō
- Starring: Hōshi Ishida; Mao Sasaki; Nanako Matsushima; Mao Inoue; Tsuyoshi Ihara
- Theme music composer: Kan Sawada
- Country of origin: Japan
- Original language: Japanese

Production
- Producers: Mamoru Koizumi; Ken Murase; Toshiaki Nanba
- Running time: 148 minutes
- Production company: Nippon Television Network

Original release
- Network: NTV
- Release: November 1, 2005

Grave of the Fireflies (火垂るの墓, Hotaru no Haka) is a live-action TV drama adaptation of Grave of the Fireflies, made by NTV in Japan. It was produced in commemoration of the 60th anniversary of the end of World War II. The drama aired on November 1, 2005. Like the anime, the live-action version of Grave of the Fireflies focuses on two siblings, Seita and Setsuko, struggling to survive the final days of the war in Kobe, Japan. Unlike the animated version, it tells the story from the point of view of their cousin and also illustrates the war changing a kind lady into a hard-hearted woman. The film stars Nanako Matsushima as the aunt and Mao Inoue in a dual role as the cousin and the cousin's granddaughter.

== Plot ==
In 2005, in Kobe, Japan, Hisako Sawano (Seita and Setsuko's aunt) has died aged 95. Hisako's eldest daughter, Natsu (Seita's and Setsuko's cousin), sorts through her mother's belongings with her teenage granddaughter, Keiko, who finds the fruit drop tin. Natsu tells her about struggling to survive the Second World War, and its emotional scars.

In September 1945, Hisako and Natsu go to Kobe station to find Seita, but cannot. A janitor recalls a dead boy matching Seita's description the previous night. While removing his corpse, a metal fruit drop tin had fallen and, thinking it rubbish, the janitor tossed it away. Hisako locates the tin with two pieces of bone inside – Setsuko's. After Natsu leaves, Hisako sees two glowing fireflies under the tin. Watching them fly away, she whispers, "Thanks".

In 1943, Seita's father, a Captain in the Imperial Navy, reveals that the war is going badly, saying Seita must look after his mother, Kyoko, and sister when he is deployed. Seita's uncle, Genzo, has been drafted into the army. Hisako and Natsu try to be optimistic for Hana, Yuki, and Teizō. When the families meet, Hisako gives Setsuko a tin of fruit drops. Hisako and Kyoko agree to help each other while their husbands are away.

On the day of the Kobe firebombings, Kyoko goes ahead to the bomb shelter due to her heart condition as Seita and Setsuko are caught outside but escape unharmed. After the bombings, Hisako reveals that Kyoko was injured. Seita goes to see her while Hisako watches Setsuko. Kyoko dies.

Seita is given an urn containing his mother's ashes and tells Hisako that he will now take care of Setsuko. He writes to his father about Kyoko's death and that he and Setsuko are staying with their aunt. He gives Setsuko their mother's jade ring, which Setsuko wears on a necklace.

Hisako worries about how she will feed the children. She sells her kimono, and learns that her husband has been killed. Seita assures Hisako that his death has meaning, upsetting her. When Teizō suffers an asthma attack, Hisako leaves to find a doctor.

Hisako serves Seita and Setsuko only soup without rice while Hisako's children get plenty. Hisako scolds Seita that he should help by letting her sell his mother's ring. Seita gives it to her, angering Setusko.

Hisako continues to feed Seita and Setsuko very little, ignoring Natsu's chastising. Seita and Setsuko leave to live in an abandoned bomb shelter despite their cousins' protests.

Seita entertains Setsuko by catching fireflies and releasing them inside the shelter. Setsuko says she knows their mother died. Seita assures Setsuko that Japan will win and their father will return.

Seita and Setsuko begin to starve, and Seita steals food from a farmer which Natsu witnesses. When the farmer catches Seita and asks if she knows him, Natsu makes no comment and Seita leaves with Setsuko.

Seita is caught stealing food from a shop, and is beaten up and taken to the police. Hisako is warned that if he does it again, she will be held responsible. Seita runs back to the shelter in tears and Setsuko comforts him.

Setsuko tries to eat marbles, thinking they are fruit drops. Seita decides to use their remaining money to buy her food. The emperor announces Japan's surrender, and Seita learns that the imperial fleet was wiped out, meaning his father has died.

Seita returns to the shop and begs them to sell him food. He returns to the shelter to find that Setsuko has died. Natsu and Hisako try to find Seita and Setsuko and are shocked to see how they had been living. Seita takes Setsuko's body to the top of a hill, where he cremates her in a straw casket, and fireflies arrive. Seita places some of his sister's bones in the fruit-drop tin, then goes to the railway station where he dies of starvation, just a day after a law was passed to protect child war victims.

Following this flashback, Natsu and Hisako leave the station. Natsu feels guilty and unable to live with what happened to Seita and Setsuko. Hisako slaps her, warning that the real war has begun and dying means losing. Natsu narrates that her family moved back to Tokyo, and Hisako never again mentioned the war.

In the present day, Natsu and Keiko are on the same bridge. Natsu reflects on how the war changed everyone, and casts Setsuko's remains into the river. Two fireflies fly away.

As the film's credits roll, images of real life children affected by military violence are shown, interspersed with images of Seita and Setsuko.

== Reception ==
The drama is liberal in deviating from the original work. The author will be grateful if my novel, being adapted now, 60 years after the war, could convey the brutality of wars, even just a little bit, to the people living in the present days.

— Akiyuki Nosaka

== Cast ==
- Mao Inoue (young woman) as Natsu Sawano (澤野 なつ, Sawano Natsu): As a 16-year-old, Natsu is Hisako's eldest daughter and Seita and Setsuko's cousin. She forms a relationship with Seita and protests how Hisako treats Seita and Setsuko.
- Keiko Kishi (old woman) as Natsu Mitsumura (光村 なつ, Mitsumura Natsu): As a 76-year-old, Natsu remembers the old days and tells the story to her granddaughter.
- Mao Inoue as Keiko Mitsumura (光村 恵子, Mitsumura Keiko): Keiko is Natsu's granddaughter and Hisako's great-granddaughter, who listens intently as Natsu recounts her experiences during the war.
- Nanako Matsushima as Hisako Sawano (澤野 久子, Sawano Hisako): 35-year-old Hisako is Seita and Setsuko's aunt
- Tsuyoshi Ihara as Genzō Sawano (澤野 源造, Sawano Genzō): 39-year-old Genzō is Hisako's husband and Natsu's father.
- Jun Kaname as Yoshie Sawano (澤野 善衛, Sawano Yoshie): Yoshie is Genzō's brother, and Hisako's brother-in-law. Because he has a bad leg, he was not called into service.
- Mayuko Fukuda as Hana Sawano (澤野 はな, Sawano Hana): 12-year-old Hana is one of Hisako's daughters.
- Narumi Iihara as Yuki Sawano (澤野 ゆき, Sawano Yuki): 10-year-old Yuki is one of Hisako's daughters.
- Shōta Horie as Teizō Sawano (澤野 貞造, Sawano Teizō): 7-year-old Teizō is Hisako's only son. He has asthma.
- Ikki Sawamura as Kiyoshi Yokokawa (横川 清, Yokokawa Kiyoshi): Kiyoshi is Seita and Setsuko's father and a colonel in the Japanese Navy.
- Yui Natsukawa as Kyoko Yokokawa (横川 恭子, Yokokawa Kyoko): Kyoko is Seita and Setsuko's mother. She has heart problems.
- Hōshi Ishida as Seita Yokokawa (横川 清太, Yokokawa Seita): 15-year-old Seita is the son of a Japanese naval commander.
- Mao Sasaki as Setsuko Yokokawa (横川 節子, Yokokawa Setsuko): 5-year-old Setsuko is Seita's younger sister.

== See also ==
- Grave of the Fireflies – 1988 Japanese animated film
