= Grave of the Fireflies (short story) =

1967 semi-autobiographical short story by Akiyuki Nosaka

- Short story by Akiyuki Nosaka
- Original title: Hotaru no Haka
- Translator: James R. Abrams (1978); Ginny Tapley Takemori (2025)
- Country: Japan
- Language: Japanese
- Genres: Semi-autobiographical; War short story; Pacific War

Publication
- Published in: Ōru Yomimono
- Publication type: Periodical
- Publisher: Bungeishunjū
- Media type: Print
- Publication date: October 1967
- Published in English: 1978

"Grave of the Fireflies" (Japanese: 火垂るの墓, Hepburn: Hotaru no Haka) is a 1967 semi-autobiographical short story by Japanese author Akiyuki Nosaka. It is based on his experiences before, during, and after the firebombing of Kobe in 1945. One of his sisters died as the result of sickness, his adoptive father died during the firebombing proper, and his younger adoptive sister Keiko died of malnutrition in Fukui. It was written as a personal apology to Keiko, regarding her death.

The story was first published in Japan in Ōru Yomimono (オール読物; "All for Reading"), a monthly literature magazine published by Bungeishunjū, in October 1967. Nosaka won the Naoki Prize for best popular literature for this story and "American Hijiki", which was published a month before. Both short stories along with four others were bundled as a book in 1968, published by Shinchōsha (ISBN 4-10-111203-7). "Grave of the Fireflies" was translated into English by James R. Abrams and published in an issue of the Japan Quarterly in 1978. It was later adapted into the 1988 anime film Grave of the Fireflies, directed by Isao Takahata. The film was released on April 16, 1988, over twenty years after the publication of the original work. It was adapted again into the 2005 live-action television film, and another live-action film in 2008. A second English translation by Ginny Tapley Takemori was published in 2025 by Penguin Classics in the UK.

Nosaka explained that "Grave of the Fireflies" is a "double-suicide story". Isao Takahata, the anime film director, said that he saw similarities to Chikamatsu Monzaemon's double-suicide plays.

== Development ==
Akiyuki Nosaka wrote the book in 1967 during a period of high economic growth. Nosaka said that the era felt strange to him and that "the real spirit of humanity was different" and so he wished to depict an "idealized humanity" between a brother and sister, or "ultimately, of a man and a woman." He added that he wished to place Seita, the main character, "in an idealized situation." Nosaka said that he himself had been in such a scenario until age fourteen and then had to grow up very quickly, becoming "worse off" than other children.

== Characters ==
=== Seita ===
Nosaka explained that Seita and Setsuko survive the wartime environment by "locking themselves up in a world of their own." Nosaka added that after their mother, their sole guardian, dies, Seita "decides to become the guardian of his little sister, even if it means making an enemy out of the world." At one point, Seita has a favorable reception to making himself a source of food for his sister. Nosaka argued, "On the one hand, that's very tragic, but it's also a blessed situation. For Seita, it's like he can try to build a heaven for just the two of them." Nosaka argued that while Seita is "when it comes to reality" not a romanticist for he also becomes hungry, "objectively speaking" Setsuko, at age four, is at the period when "a girl looks the cutest" and Seita is just becoming aware of his masculinity in his adolescent period. Nosaka said that the two have an "obvious consanguineous relationship" and that Setsuko is the only person Seita can confide in. Nosaka added that "while there's a strong blood tie, he's shut out from being able to love her as a girl" and that his tension increases to high levels and therefore sublimation takes place.

Nosaka explained that Seita "is rather spoiled for a wartime child" and therefore the children of 1987 would act like he would if they were put in that situation. Isao Takahata said that he was compelled to adapt the story into an animation after seeing how Seita "was a unique wartime ninth grader." He previously believed that boys always developed the will to live, but Seita instead chooses not to endure difficult feelings; when his aunt insults him, Seita does not act in a stoic manner and instead withdraws from the situation. Takahata argued that Seita's feelings are better understood by the children in 1987, who often base decisions on whether or not they are pleasant, while during that year his generation had the belief that Seita needed to endure it. Takahata argued that "[i]t's not only the children... I think the times are becoming that way, as well", and therefore he liked the idea of adapting the story as a film.

Nosaka said that in the story, Seita "got increasingly transformed into a better human being" since he was trying to "compensate for everything I couldn't do myself" and that he was never "kind like the main character." Nosaka explained that "I always thought I wanted to perform those generous acts in my head, but I couldn't do so." He believed that he would always give food to his sister, but when he obtained food, he ate it. The food tasted very good when it was scarce, but he felt remorse afterwards. Nosaka concluded, "I'd think there is no one more hopeless in the world than me. I didn't put anything about this in the novel."

=== Setsuko ===
Nosaka said that Setsuko also has to grow up quickly, and she takes the role of Seita's mother, "and at other times, the role of his companion." Setsuko acts as Seita's spiritual support while Setsuko relies on Seita for nourishment. Nosaka said that "[i]n the end, it turns out that the days leading up to their death are like the development of a love story."

Nosaka said that the death of his sister was "an exact match with the novel."
