= Sakuma drops =

Japanese hard candy

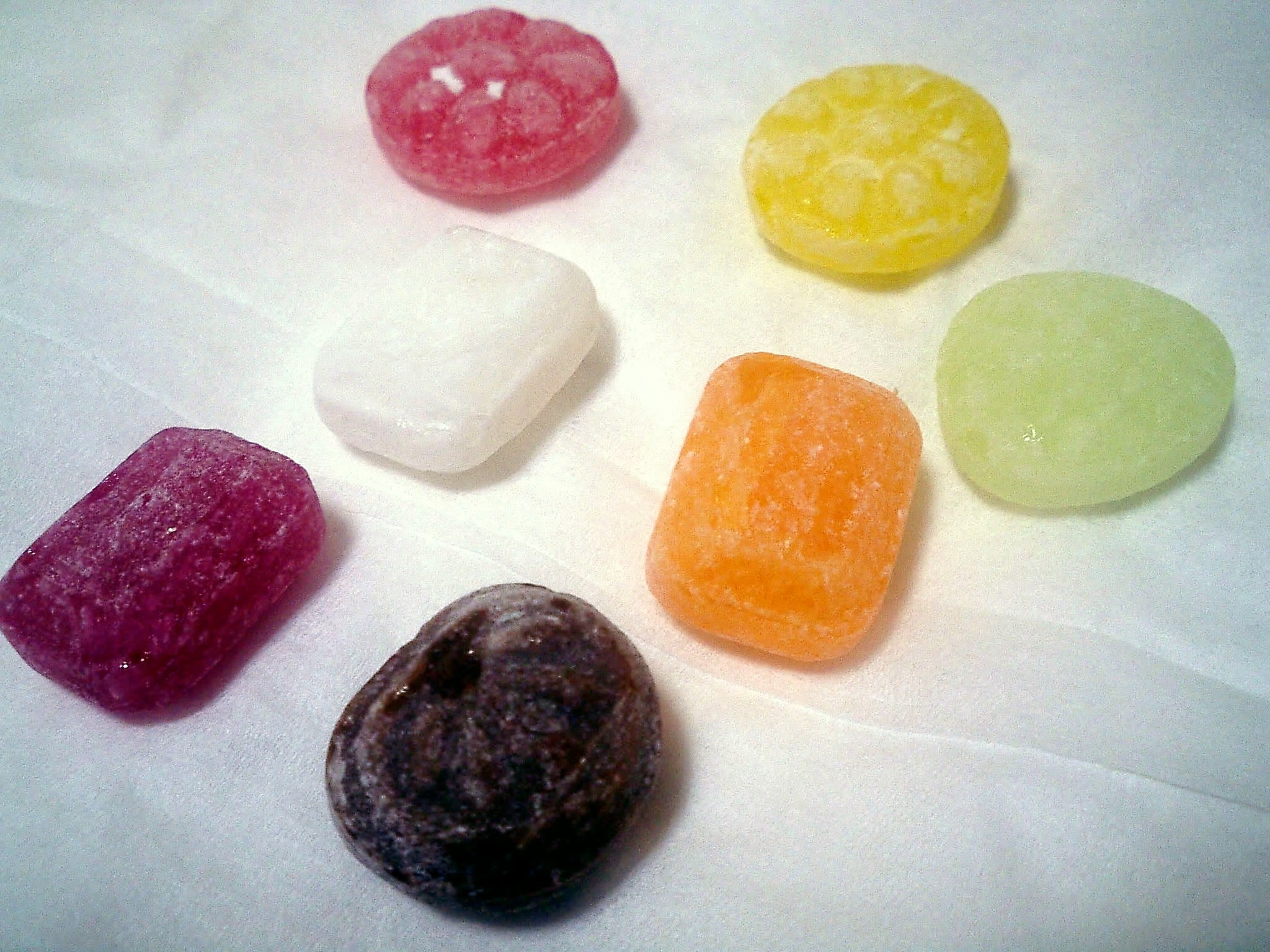
Sakuma drops

Sakuma drops (サクマドロップス, Sakuma Doroppusu) are a hard candy from Japan, flavored with fruit juice. Available since the Meiji period from 1908, the candies have become an easily recognizable icon in Japan.

== Products ==
The candies are sold in 4-by-3.5-inch (10.2 by 8.9 cm) tin cans with a tin pull cap. Sakuma tins are considered collectible items, as the design frequently changes.

== History ==
The candy was originally made by Sakuma Candy (佐久間製菓, Sakuma Seika), based in Ikebukuro, Tokyo in 1908. The company ceased production during World War 2 due to the sugar shortages. After the war, employees of the original company founded two new companies that continued making the candy, one using the original name and a second also called Sakuma Candy (サクマ製菓), but written in katakana instead of kanji. The second company holds the trademark to the name "Sakuma Drops" and sells their candy as such in green cans, while the original used the name "Sakuma's Drops" (サクマ式ドロップス (Sakuma-shiki doroppusu, "Sakuma-style drops")) and red tins.

On 9 November 2022, the original company announced they would cease operations on 20 January 2023.

== In popular culture ==
Sakuma drops are best known in the West from their appearance in the 1988 Studio Ghibli animated film Grave of the Fireflies (火垂るの墓, Hotaru no Haka), as it played a prominent motif in the film. Commemorative tins resembling the one depicted in the film and featuring an image of one of the main characters, Setsuko, have been released several times over the years.
