= Tsutomu Tatsumi =

Japanese actor (born 1972)

- 辰巳努
- Born: March 1972; Kansai region, Japan
- Occupation: Actor
- Years active: 1980s
- Known for: Grave of the Fireflies

Tsutomu Tatsumi (辰巳 努, Tatsumi Tsutomu) is a former actor from Kansai, Japan. At the time, he was affiliated with Actor Pro.

== Biography ==
Active primarily as a child actor in the 1980s, Tatsumi earned high praise for his roles as Takayuki Yoshizawa (Dankichi) in the film MacArthur's Children and as the protagonist in his younger days in Itoshiki Hibi Yo. He then garnered significant attention for voicing the protagonist Seita in the 1988 film Grave of the Fireflies. He was 16 years old when he voiced Seita in the film, partly because Seita's character was 14—an age close to Tatsumi's own at the time—and partly because the story is set in the Kansai region, where he was from; director Isao Takahata had also specifically sought out actors from the Kansai area. He later remarked, "It's easier to empathize when the character is close to your own age," and this was also the case with Ayano Shiraishi, who voiced Setsuko.

In the movie pamphlet, Tatsumi remarked, "I think if he had been more articulate, he might have had an easier life," and "Since things get harder as life goes on, I think if he could have apologized more honestly, he might have managed to live a better life." When the film was first broadcast on Friday Roadshow, he stated, "I don't think I'd want to live a life like Seita's." On Setsuko, he drew a parallel with his own tendency to be cold toward his own younger brother, saying, "I don't think I could be that kind." As for Shiraishi, he remarked, "Her voice made it much easier for me. Because it was her voice, perhaps that's why my lines came out so naturally when Setsuko was on the verge of death at the end."

Since Tatsumi's appearance in the TV drama Buchō Keiji (aired June 24, 1989), no further entertainment activities have been confirmed, and his current whereabouts are completely unknown. When a commemorative event for the Blu-ray release of Grave of the Fireflies was held in 2012, the organizers reportedly made every effort to invite Tatsumi, but were forced to give up because they could not find his contact information. Since the event was livestreamed online that day, he was even urged to "come to the venue if you're watching," but this did not come to pass.

== Filmography ==
=== Films ===
- MacArthur's Children (1984, Japan Herald) - Takayuki Yoshizawa (Dankichi)
- Itoshiki Hibi Yo (1984, Toho) - Toshio Segawa (boyhood)
- Grave of the Fireflies (1988, Studio Ghibli) - Seita

=== TV dramas ===
- Jiken Desu Yo! - Episode 20 (February 18, 1982, Kansai Television)
- Toshiba Sunday Theater - Episode 1343 (September 19, 1982, Mainichi Broadcasting)
- Soreike! Zukkoke Sanningumi - Episode 31 (1985, Kansai Television)
- Buchō Keiji (Asahi Broadcasting)
  - Episode 1558 (September 10, 1988)
  - Episode 1585 (March 25, 1989)
  - Episode 1598 (June 24, 1989)

=== Serial TV dramas ===
- Onna no Tatakai (March – June 1983)
- Haha Wa Oshikake Dōkyonin (April – May 1986)

=== Television Animation ===
- Jarinko Chie (1981) Extra appearance

=== Commercials ===
- Sankutēru
