= Akiyuki Nosaka =

Japanese politician (1930–2015)

- 野坂 昭如

Member of the House of Councillors
- In office 10 July 1983 – 3 December 1983
- Preceded by: Constituency established
- Succeeded by: Columbia Top
- Constituency: National PR

Personal details
- Born: 10 October 1930 Kamakura, Kanagawa, Japan
- Died: 9 December 2015 (aged 85) Tokyo, Japan
- Party: Dainiin Club
- Relatives: Sukeyuki Nosaka
- Occupation: Novelist; singer; lyricist
- Writing career
- Pen name: Yukio Aki
- Period: 1950s–2015
- Notable work: "Grave of the Fireflies"

Akiyuki Nosaka (野坂 昭如, Nosaka Akiyuki; October 10, 1930 – December 9, 2015) was a Japanese novelist, journalist, singer, lyricist, and member of the House of Councillors. As a broadcasting writer he used the name Yukio Aki (阿木 由紀夫, Aki Yukio) and his alias as a chanson singer was Claude Nosaka (クロード 野坂, Kurōdo Nosaka). He wrote the short story "Grave of the Fireflies" based on his experiences in the wake of American bombing during the Second World War; the short story has been adapted into both an animated film and a live-action film.

== Early life ==
Nosaka was born in Kamakura, Kanagawa, the son of Sukeyuki Nosaka, who was an official of the Tokyo Metropolitan Bureau of Construction. Nosaka is part of the "Generation of the Ashes" (Yakeato Sedai), which includes other writers like Kenzaburō Ōe and Makoto Oda.

Together with his sister he grew up as an adopted child of a Harimaya family in Nada, Kobe, Hyōgo. His foster mother, Aiko, was his maternal aunt. In March 1941 his foster parents adopted a baby girl named Kikuko, who died of illness before the end of the year. In 1944 they adopted a second young girl named Keiko.

During the June 5, 1945 bombing of Kobe, Nosaka lost both his home and his adoptive father to the firebombs. Aiko was afflicted with severe burns across her body and had to be taken by rickshaw to a nearby hospital, leaving Keiko and Nosaka in the care of a widow in Manchidanicho, a resort area in Nishinomiya. Nosaka became enamored with the widow's daughter, Kyoko, who was two years older than him. When they moved in they brought a large pack of provisions buried at their destroyed home that their adoptive father had stored for emergencies. However, it ran out quickly, and they began having to survive on rice and stolen vegetables and other foodstuffs Nosaka could forage, like snails. Keiko began to suffer from malnutrition, both from being unable to eat hard foods and because Nosaka would often eat her portion of food. He described himself in retrospect as a gaki, blowing on spoonfuls of broth to cool for her but instead finding himself putting them in his own mouth. In "The Distance of Fifty Steps" he said:

"When I think of how my sister wasted away to skin and bones by a process of reverse development that eventually left her too weak to raise her head or even cry, how she died alone, and how there was nothing left of her but ash after she was cremated, I feel that I was too preoccupied with self-preservation. When I found myself in the hell of starvation, I ate her share of food..."

Traumatized by the attack he had already survived, Nosaka would immediately flee with Keiko to a nearby bomb shelter whenever he heard air raid sirens. This led to the neighbors labeling him a "coward", for running away instead of helping with firefighting duties. Kyoko would often accompany them to the shelter as well. In July 1945 she was mobilized to work at a nearby factory; her absence encouraged Nosaka to take Keiko to live permanently at the bomb shelter, combined with the negative attention from the neighbors and an incident between their host and their grandmother. Aiko's mother Koto twice accused the widow of stealing goods that had been left in her charge. The widow then moved all their belongings to the hallway and said if they were really so valuable, they should be taken to the bomb shelter for safekeeping.

The stay at the bomb shelter worsened Keiko's condition. By August, the two siblings were sent to Fukui Prefecture to stay with an acquaintance. Keiko stopped walking and reverted to crawling, too weak to even eat or cry. She eventually died in her sleep on August 21; Nosaka obtained a death certificate, cremated her remains, and left for Moriguchi to reunite with what was left of his family. By this point his adopted mother Aiko was recovering, though still injured.

In 1946 Nosaka returned to school, but failed the high school entrance exam the following year. He resorted to acting as a pimp for the occupation soldiers around Osaka. He moved to Tokyo a few months later where Aiko had extended family, but was caught stealing from two elderly women he was living with. For two months he remained in captivity along with a mix of war orphans and underage delinquents. Notably, the boys would be released if a relative came forward to claim them; however, Aiko and her relatives did not come to claim Nosaka. The cell had no furniture, only a single bucket for a toilet, and no glass panes in the window. Their diet was restricted to a mix of barley and sorghum and water. Many of his cellmates grew ill and died, and realizing that his own health was declining Nosaka informed the authorities of his biological father. He was released to Sukeyuki Nosaka by the end of December. Writing in 1992, Nosaka stated that after being rescued from the cells by his biological father in 1947 he proceeded to 'forget' all about his traumas following the bombing. Nosaka would later base his short story "Grave of the Fireflies" on these experiences.

== Early career ==
Nosaka went on to attend Waseda University. While he was still a student he began a career as a writer, composing scripts and commercial lyrics.

In 1959, he co-wrote the lyrics to the song "Toys Dancing Cha Cha Cha" (おもちゃのチャチャチャ, Omocha no cha cha cha) with Osamu Yoshioka. The song was later modified to be a children's nursery rhyme, and won the Children's Song Award at the 5th Japan Record Awards. "The Toys' Cha Cha Cha" has gone on to be covered by dozens of artists.

Nosaka has conversely been noted, in his other works, for his preference for sexually explicit material and distinctive writing style, which has been likened to the comic-prose of the seventeenth-century Japanese writer Ihara Saikaku. His debut novel The Pornographers was translated into English by Michael Gallagher and published in 1968. It was also adapted into a live-action film, The Pornographers, directed by Shōhei Imamura.

== Writing about the War ==
Nosaka married in 1962, and two years later had a daughter named Mao. As she grew older, she inadvertently became a trigger of suppressed traumas related to Keiko. Nosaka would become "irrationally agitated" whenever Mao wouldn't finish eating all of her food. He became paranoid that she would suddenly drop dead or die in her sleep, and would have visions of his house and family going up in flames. In "A Playboy's Nursery Songs", Nosaka wrote:

"Mao is now about the same age my unfortunate sisters were when they died, and their images overlap. I feel unqualified to be Mao’s father, and I wonder how long I’ll be able to look after her and protect her."

As the Second Indochina War was going on, images of the conflict were also showing up more and more often in the news. In response to all of this, Nosaka began to write more openly about his experiences.

In 1967 he wrote a number of pieces about the war. "A Playboy's Nursery Songs" serves as one of his earliest 'factual accounts' of the June 5th attack and its aftermath. His short story "American Hijiki" is a fictional story about a man who grew up in Japan during the war, noting the sudden contrast of attitudes towards the West and the United States in particular between regimes.

Also in 1967 he wrote the short story "Hotaru no Haka", translated into English as both "A Grave of Fireflies" or "Grave of the Fireflies." The story is a semi-autobiographical retelling of his experiences with the firebombs and Keiko, told through the lens of older brother Seita and younger sister Setsuko. Notably, the story shows Seita acting far more nobly than Nosaka himself had, and while Seita loses his sister he himself also perishes by the end of the story.

Writing in 1992, Nosaka recalls:

"Pressed to meet my publisher’s deadline, I wrote as if I were on auto-pilot. It was a time when I had great confidence in my writing, and, to borrow a phrase, I wrote as if I were possessed. I let my hand do the thinking and I sent it off without revision."

Akiyuki Nosaka won the Naoki Prize for both "American Hijiki" and "Grave of the Fireflies".

== Later life ==
In July 1972, as a magazine editor, he published Kafū Nagai's Taishō era (1912–26) erotic short story "Yojōhan fusuma no shitabari". The work was immediately controversial, and in August 1972, he was prosecuted for public obscenity. During the trial, Saiichi Maruya, Sawako Ariyoshi and many other authors testified for the defense. However, in 1980, in an important decision, the Japanese Supreme Court ruled that he was guilty. He was fined 100,000 yen (slightly less than US$300 at the time).

In December 1978, Nosaka was credited for giving former rugby player-turned pro wrestler Susumu Hara his ring name, Ashura Hara.

He was elected to the Japanese Diet in 1983. The 1988 anime film Grave of the Fireflies, directed by Isao Takahata, was based on Nosaka's short story of the same name.

Nosaka suffered a stroke in 2003 and although still affected by it, he kept writing a column for the daily Mainichi Shimbun. He died in Tokyo on 9 December 2015, leaving behind his wife, Yoko, and two daughters. His death was announced on NHK's 7:00 pm broadcast the following morning, with a veteran journalist quoted as saying Nosaka was notable for questioning what most people consider common sense, but that Japan has now entered an era in which this is no longer possible.

== Selected works ==
- The Pornographers (エロ事師たち, Erogotoshi-tachi) (1963); English translation by Michael Gallagher, ISBN 0-436-31530-0
- "American Hijiki" (アメリカひじき, Amerika Hijiki) (1967); English translation included in The Penguin Book of Japanese Short Stories (2017), Jay Rubin ed.
- "Grave of the Fireflies" (火垂るの墓, Hotaru no Haka) (1967); English translation by James R. Abrams, published in an issue of the Japan Quarterly (1978)
- The Whale That Fell in Love With a Submarine (戦争童話集, Sensō Dōwashū); English translation by Ginny Tapley Takemori (2015), ISBN 978-1-782690-27-6
- The Cake Tree in the Ruins; English translation by Ginny Tapley Takemori (2018), ISBN 978-1-78227-418-6
