= New York Film Critics Circle Award for Best Animated Film =

Award given by the New York Film Critics Circle

- Description: Honoring the finest achievements in animated filmmaking
- Country: United States
- Presented by: New York Film Critics Circle (NYFCC)
- Website: www.nyfcc.com

The New York Film Critics Circle Award for Best Animated Film (Feature) is an award given by the New York Film Critics Circle, honoring the finest achievements in animated filmmaking.

== Winners ==
=== 1990s ===
| Year | Winner | Director(s) |
|---|---|---|
| 1999 | South Park: Bigger, Longer & Uncut | Trey Parker |

=== 2000s ===
| Year | Winner | Director(s) |
|---|---|---|
| 2000 | Chicken Run | Peter Lord and Nick Park |
| 2001 | Waking Life | Richard Linklater |
| 2002 | Spirited Away | Hayao Miyazaki |
| 2003 | The Triplets of Belleville | Sylvain Chomet |
| 2004 | The Incredibles | Brad Bird |
| 2005 | Howl's Moving Castle | Hayao Miyazaki |
| 2006 | Happy Feet | George Miller |
| 2007 | Persepolis | Vincent Paronnaud and Marjane Satrapi |
| 2008 | WALL-E | Andrew Stanton |
| 2009 | Fantastic Mr. Fox | Wes Anderson |

=== 2010s ===
| Year | Winner | Director(s) |
|---|---|---|
| 2010 | The Illusionist | Sylvain Chomet |
| 2011 | No award given out this year | |
| 2012 | Frankenweenie | Tim Burton |
| 2013 | The Wind Rises | Hayao Miyazaki |
| 2014 | The Lego Movie | Phil Lord and Christopher Miller |
| 2015 | Inside Out | Pete Docter and Ronnie del Carmen |
| 2016 | Zootopia | Byron Howard and Rich Moore |
| 2017 | Coco | Lee Unkrich and Adrian Molina |
| 2018 | Spider-Man: Into the Spider-Verse | Bob Persichetti, Peter Ramsey and Rodney Rothman |
| 2019 | I Lost My Body | Jérémy Clapin |

=== 2020s ===
| Year | Winner | Director(s) |
|---|---|---|
| 2020 | Wolfwalkers | Tomm Moore and Ross Stewart |
| 2021 | The Mitchells vs. the Machines | Mike Rianda |
| 2022 | Marcel the Shell with Shoes On | Dean Fleischer-Camp |
| 2023 | The Boy and the Heron | Hayao Miyazaki |
| 2024 | Flow | Gints Zilbalodis |
| 2025 | KPop Demon Hunters | Chris Appelhans and Maggie Kang |

=== Multiple winners ===
- Hayao Miyazaki - 4
