= Blue Ribbon Awards Special Award =

Japanese film award

- Awarded for: Special Award
- Country: Japan
- Presented by: The Association of Tokyo Film Journalists
- First award: 1988

The Blue Ribbon Awards Special Award is a special prize. It is awarded irregularly by the Association of Tokyo Film Journalists as one of the Blue Ribbon Awards. It was firstly awarded in 1988 at 31st Blue Ribbon Awards.

== List of winners ==
No.	Year	Recipient(s)
31	1988	My Neighbor Totoro; Grave of the Fireflies
32	1989	N/A
33	1990	N/A
34	1991	N/A
35	1992	N/A
36	1993	Kinchan no Cinema Jack directed by Kinichi Hagimoto
37	1994	N/A
38	1995	Kiyoshi Atsumi
39	1996	Kiyoshi Atsumi for his honorable work of the film Otoko wa Tsurai yo series.
39	1996	Nemuru Otoko produced by the local government Gunma Prefecture.
40	1997	Princess Mononoke
41	1998	Akira Kurosawa, Keisuke Kinoshita
42	1999	N/A
43	2000	N/A
44	2001	N/A
45	2002	Kinji Fukasaku
46	2003	Ken Watanabe for his appearance in The Last Samurai.
47	2004	N/A
48	2005	Kihachi Okamoto
49	2006	Shohei Imamura
50	2007	Hitoshi Ueki
51	2008	Kon Ichikawa, Ken Ogata
52	2009	Series of the film Tsuribaka Nisshi
53	2010	N/A
54	2011	Yoshio Harada
55	2012	Kōji Wakamatsu
56	2013	Nagisa Oshima, Rentarō Mikuni
57	2014	N/A
58	2015	N/A
59	2016	Your Name
