= Hong Kong Film Award for Best Asian Film =

Former Chinese film award

Best Asian Film Award
- Country: Hong Kong
- Presented by: Hong Kong Film Awards
- First award: 2002 - 2011
- Website: HKFA

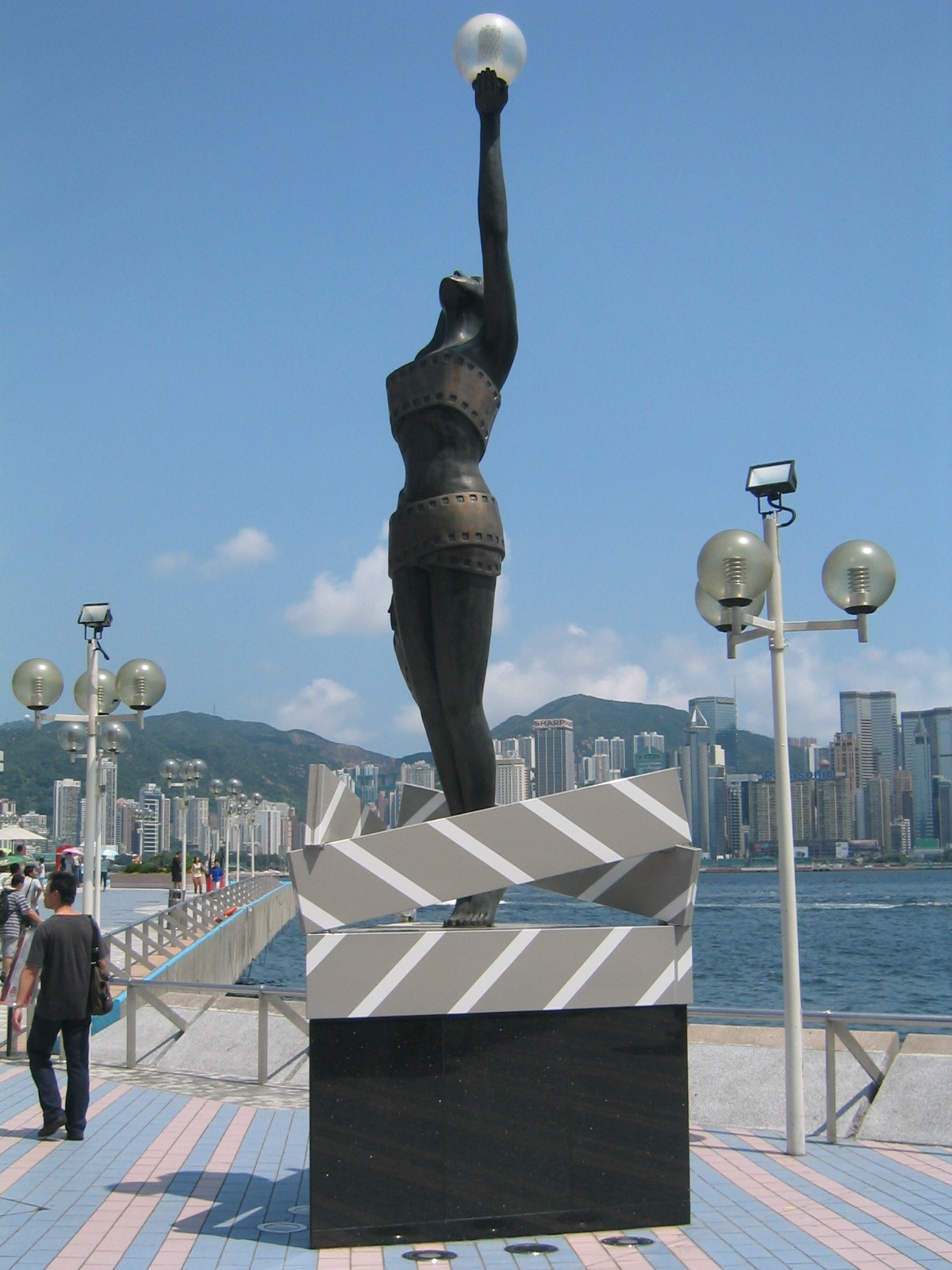
An upscaled statue of the Hong Kong Film Award on The Avenue of Stars at Tsim Sha Tsui, Hong Kong

The Hong Kong Film Award for Best Asian Film is a retired Hong Kong Film Award that was presented from 2003 to 2011. The award has since been replaced by the award for Best Film from Mainland and Taiwan.
