= Grave of the Fireflies =

1988 Japanese animated film

- Theatrical release poster

Japanese name
- Kanji: 火垂るの墓
Transcriptions
- Revised Hepburn: Hotaru no Haka
- Directed by: Isao Takahata
- Screenplay by: Isao Takahata
- Based on: "Grave of the Fireflies" by Akiyuki Nosaka
- Produced by: Toru Hara
- Starring: Tsutomu Tatsumi; Ayano Shiraishi; Yoshiko Shinohara; Akemi Yamaguchi
- Cinematography: Nobuo Koyama
- Edited by: Takeshi Seyama
- Music by: Michio Mamiya
- Production company: Studio Ghibli
- Distributed by: Toho
- Release date: 16 April 1988
- Running time: 89 minutes
- Country: Japan
- Language: Japanese
- Box office: ¥1.7 billion (Japan); $4.7 million (overseas)

Grave of the Fireflies (Note: Japanese: 火垂るの墓, Hepburn: Hotaru no Haka) is a 1988 Japanese animated war film written and directed by Isao Takahata. It stars the voices of Tsutomu Tatsumi, Ayano Shiraishi, Yoshiko Shinohara, and Akemi Yamaguchi. Based on Akiyuki Nosaka's 1967 semi-autobiographical short story of the same name, the film is set in Kobe shortly after its bombing by the U.S. Army Air Forces, and follows two orphaned siblings who desperately struggle to survive during the final months of the Pacific War.

Production began after Nosaka became interested in an animated adaptation of his book. It was animated by Studio Ghibli, and was Takahata's first film with the studio. Several critics considered it an anti-war film, but Takahata disagreed. The film was theatrically released in Japan by Toho on April 16, 1988, and was a modest success at the Japanese box office, grossing ¥1.7 billion. Its later international releases between 2018 and 2025 grossed $4.7 million overseas. It received universal acclaim and is considered by many to be Takahata's masterpiece, one of the greatest animated films of all time, and a major work of Japanese animation. It garnered particular praise for its emotional weight, and has been cited as one of the saddest films ever made.

== Plot ==
In March 1945, American bombers destroy most of Kobe during the waning days of the Pacific War. 14-year-old Seita and his 4-year-old sister, Setsuko, children of an Imperial Japanese Navy captain, survive, but their mother dies. She is cremated in a mass grave outside and Seita is seen carrying a small wooden box containing her ashes. Seita conceals their mother's death from Setsuko. The siblings move in with an aunt. He hides his mother's box of ashes in the garden. Seita retrieves a supply cache he buried before the bombing and gives everything to his aunt, except for a tin of Sakuma drops, which he gives to Setsuko. The aunt convinces Seita to sell his mother's silk kimonos for rice, which devastates Setsuko.

As rations dwindle, the aunt becomes resentful of the children as Seita does nothing to earn the food she prepares for them. At her suggestion, Seita withdraws some money from his mother's bank account to buy a charcoal stove and other supplies. Following an air raid, the siblings move into an abandoned bomb shelter. Among the belongings is the wooden box of his mother's ashes. They capture fireflies from the marshes and release them into the refuge for light. The following morning the fireflies have died. Setsuko buries them and reveals their aunt told her their mother died, then tearfully asks why the fireflies had to die so soon.

The situation becomes dire when they run out of rice. A friendly farmer recommends that Seita swallow his pride and return to his aunt, but he refuses, instead stealing crops from farms and breaking into homes during air raids. A farmer catches him and brings him to the police station, but the sympathetic policeman lets him go.

Setsuko falls ill, and a doctor explains she is suffering from malnutrition. Seita withdraws the last of the money from their mother's bank account. He is distraught to learn that Japan has surrendered and that his father is most likely dead, as most of Japan's naval fleet has been sunk. (Note: In the film, it is stated that the father of the protagonists was the captain of the heavy cruiser Maya, which was sunk on 23 October 1944 during the Battle of Leyte Gulf.) Seita returns to Setsuko with food and finds her hallucinating. She dies as Seita finishes preparing the food. Seita cremates Setsuko's body and her doll in a straw casket. He carries her ashes in the candy tin along with his father's photograph.

Seita dies of starvation a few weeks later at a Sannomiya train station surrounded by other malnourished people. A janitor, tasked with removing the bodies before the Americans' arrival, sorts through Seita's possessions. He finds the candy tin and throws it into a field. Setsuko's ashes spread out, and her spirit springs from the container, joined by Seita's spirit and a cloud of fireflies. The two board a ghostly train and, throughout the journey, look back at the events leading to Seita's death as silent, passive observers. (Note: Seita and Setsuko's observance is interspersed throughout the film as a frame story.) Their spirits, healthy and content, arrive at their destination: a hilltop bench overlooking present-day Kobe, surrounded by fireflies.

== Voice cast ==
Voice cast
Character	Japanese voice actor	English voice actor		
Character	Japanese voice actor	Skypilot Entertainment/CPM (1998)	Seraphim/Sentai (2012)	Dubbing Brothers/Netflix (2025)
Seita Yokokawa (横川 清太, Yokokawa Seita)	Tsutomu Tatsumi	J. Robert Spencer	Adam Gibbs	Lucas Jaye
Setsuko Yokokawa (横川 節子, Yokokawa Setsuko)	Ayano Shiraishi	Corinne Orr	Emily Neves	Luna Hamilton
Seita and Setsuko's Mother (清太と節子の母, Seita to Setsuko no Haha)	Yoshiko Shinohara	Veronica Taylor	Shelley Calene-Black	Unknown
Seita and Setsuko's Aunt (親戚の叔母さん, Shinseki no Obasan)	Akemi Yamaguchi	Amy Jones	Marcy Bannor	Ren Hanami

== Production ==
=== Development ===
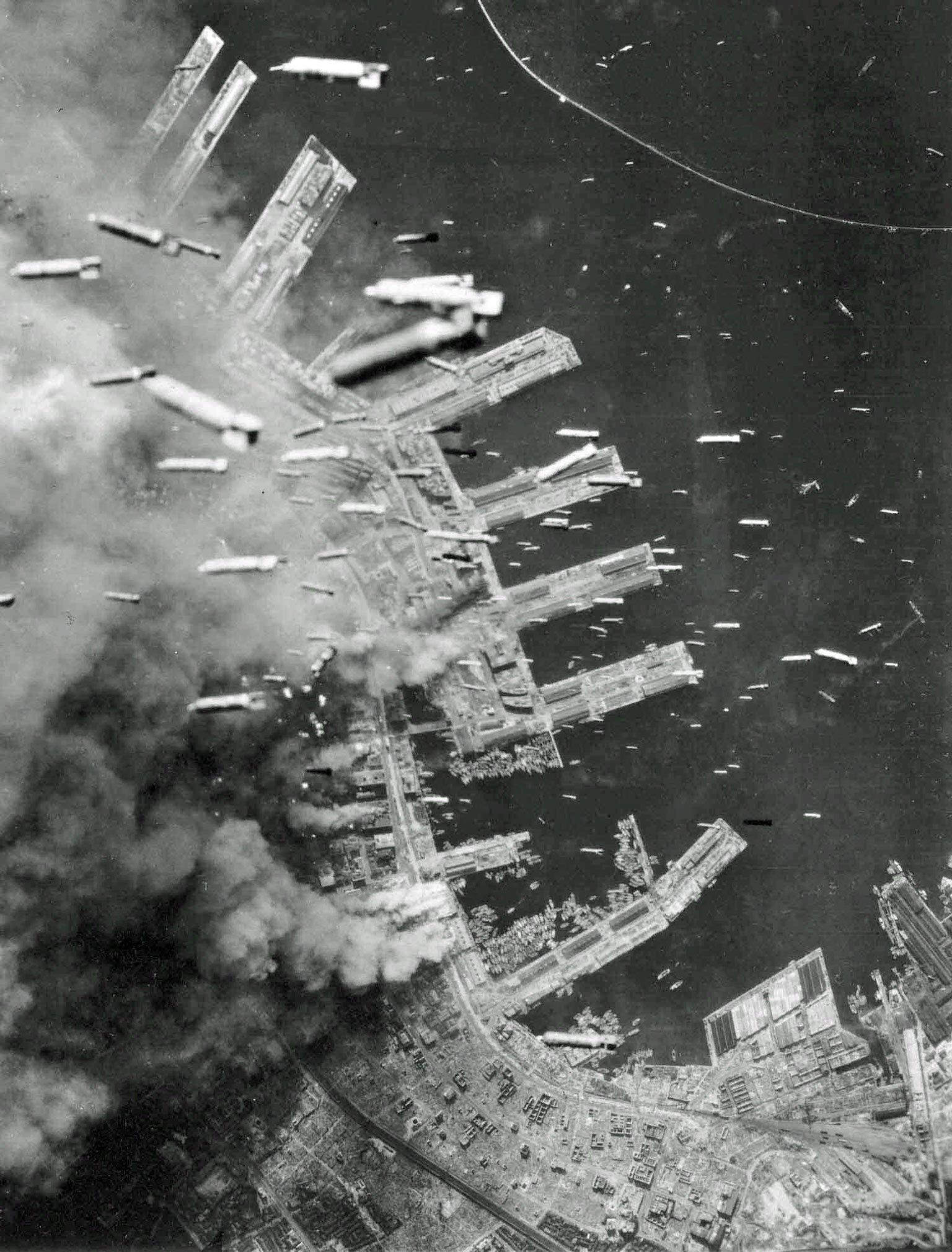
Incendiary bombs being dropped onto Kobe, the setting of the film

"Grave of the Fireflies" author Akiyuki Nosaka said that many offers had been made to make a live-action film adaptation of his short story. Nosaka argued that "it was impossible to create the barren, scorched earth that's to be the backdrop of the story". He also argued that contemporary children would not be able to convincingly play the characters. Nosaka expressed surprise when an animated version was offered. After seeing the storyboards, Nosaka concluded that it was not possible for such a story to have been made in any method other than animation and expressed surprise in how accurately the rice paddies and townscape were depicted. Although the film deals with World War II, with the exception of Isao Takahata, most of the key staff members belonged to a relatively young generation that had not experienced the war firsthand. When Nizo Yamamoto was approached by Takahata to serve as art director, he initially intended to decline, reasoning, "Wouldn't someone who experienced the war and knows the conditions of that time be better able to depict it realistically?" However, Takahata reportedly persuaded him by saying, "It is precisely because you don't know the war that I want you young people to do this". Takahata drew from his personal experience to create a realistic depiction of the air raid on Okayama. He criticized TV shows and movies that had recreated images of incendiary bombs, "They include no sparks or explosions, I was there and I experienced it, so I know what it was like."

The film features Niteko-ike Pond (ニテコ池), described as the "birthplace" of the novel and the place where Nosaka performed his daily routines of dishwashing and personal ablutions. Notably, during the final days of the Pacific War, Nosaka, then 14 years old, sought refuge with his younger sister-in-law in a relative's house and nearby bomb shelters near the pond.

Takahata said that he was compelled to film the short story after seeing how the main character, Seita, "was a unique wartime ninth grader". Takahata explained that any wartime story, whether animated or not animated, "tends to be moving and tear-jerking", and that young people develop an "inferiority complex" where they perceive people in wartime eras as being more noble and more able than they are, and therefore the audience believes that the story has nothing to do with them. Takahata argued that he wanted to dispel this mindset. When Nosaka asked if the film characters were "having fun", Takahata answered that he clearly depicted Seita and Setsuko had "substantial" days and that they were "enjoying their days". Takahata said that Setsuko was even more difficult to animate than Seita, and that he had never before depicted a girl younger than five. Auditions were held for her role based on his request for "a child actor of the same age as Setsuko who speaks the Kansai dialect", and Ayano Shiraishi, then five years old, was selected. After being cast, Shiraishi received verbal direction on her lines from her manager and then recorded her voice using the "prescoring" method (where the voice is recorded before the animation is completed), which stemmed from Takahata's desire to "incorporate the timing, accent, and even the breathing of the performer into the animation" (In Japanese animation production, it is common practice to record the voice-overs after the animation has been completed). Takahata said that "In that respect, when you make the book into a movie, Setsuko becomes a tangible person", and that four-year-olds often become more assertive and self-centered, and try to get their own ways during that age. He explained that while one could "have a scene where Seita can't stand that anymore", it is "difficult to incorporate into a story". Takahata explained that the film is from Seita's point of view, "and even objective passages are filtered through his feelings".

Takahata said that he had considered using non-traditional animation methods, but because "the schedule was planned and the movie's release date set, and the staff assembled, it was apparent there was no room for such a trial-and-error approach". He further remarked that he had difficulty animating the scenery since, in Japanese animation, one is "not allowed" to depict Japan in a realistic manner. Animators often traveled to foreign countries to do research on how to depict them, but such research had not been done before for a Japanese setting. Since depicting wartime scenery was a major challenge for the production staff, location scouting was conducted in advance in Nishinomiya and Kobe under the guidance of Nosaka. Additionally, the staff watched director Yasujirō Ozu's films Tokyo Story and Good Morning, drawing inspiration from their depiction of the cramped Japanese houses typical of around 1945 and their focus on measured, understated performances. While animating the movie, Takahata also created several different cuts of the scene in which Seita cremates Setsuko's body. Takahata spent a lot of time on this scene, trying to create the perfect iteration of it. Each of these cuts remained unfinished and unused in the end.

Most of the illustration outlines in the film are in brown, instead of the customary black. Black outlines were only used when it was absolutely necessary. Color coordinator Michiyo Yasuda said this was done to give the film a softer feel. Yasuda said that this technique had never been used in an anime before Grave of the Fireflies, "and it was done on a challenge". Yasuda explained that brown is more difficult to use than black because it does not contrast as well as black.

Grave of the Fireflies was Takahata's first animated film produced with Studio Ghibli.

Production of Grave of the Fireflies and My Neighbor Totoro proceeded simultaneously at Ghibli. It is said that even Toei Dōga had never worked on two feature-length films at the same time, and since there were only a limited number of key staff members (animators) who could meet the high standards of Takahata and Miyazaki, the production team struggled to manage their personnel. A particular point of contention was the treatment of animation director Yoshifumi Kondō. As a result, while Miyazaki's team focused on newly recruited staff, Takahata's team gathered veteran staff members he had known for years, such as Kondō, Yoshiyuki Momose and art director Yamamoto. In later recollections, Takahata stated that securing Kondō was his "top priority—no, an absolute must" in terms of personnel, and that he did not personally recruit any other members.

The location and background in the film is based on a style created by 18th century Japanese artist Hiroshige and his follower Hergé, who created Tintin. Film critic Roger Ebert examines the contrast of the style of the background in comparison to the cartoonish animation of the characters. He claims that there is an unusual amount of detail in the evocative landscape, while the characters are a take on the modern Japanese animation style, with childlike bodies and enormous eyes. Ebert believed that this deliberate animation style embodies the true purpose of animation, which is to recreate the raw emotion of human life by simplifying reality to emphasize ideas. He concludes his analysis with saying, "Yes, it's a cartoon, and the kids have eyes like saucers, but it belongs on any list of the greatest war films ever made." According to Wendy Goldberg, Takahata's film also includes criticism of the emphasis on nationalism in Japan. In a particular scene, Seita's desire to join his father reflects a "national fantasy of war", which leads him to neglect his sister.

=== Music ===
The music for the film was composed by Michio Mamiya. The theme song, "Home Sweet Home", was performed by coloratura soprano Amelita Galli-Curci. During an interview about his music, Mamiya stated that he creates his music to encourage peace.

The soundtrack album titled Grave of the Fireflies Soundtrack Collection (火垂るの墓 サウンドトラック集, Hotaru no Haka Saundotorakku Shū) was first released on 5 April 1997 by Studio Ghibli Records and Tokuma Japan Communications, and later re-released on 25 June 1998 by Animage.

The soundtrack does not contain standalone music and instead features both dialogue and music as they appear in the film.

Another soundtrack album titled Grave of the Fireflies Image Album Collection (火垂るの墓 イメージ・アルバム集, Hotaru no Haka Imeji Arubamu Shū) was first released on 5 April 1997 Studio Ghibli Records and Tokuma Japan Communications, and later re-released on 25 November 1997 by Animage.

== Themes and analysis ==
In his book about the film, Alex Dudok de Wit called Grave of the Fireflies an "unusually personal adaptation" of Nosaka's short story as Takahata had similar experiences during the war, though noted it deviated significantly in its portrayal of the children as ghosts in its opening sequence whereas the short story began immediately with the children losing their mother during the air raid.

Some critics in the West have viewed Grave of the Fireflies as an anti-war film due to the graphic and emotional depiction of the pernicious repercussions of war on a society, and the individuals therein. The film focuses its attention almost entirely on the personal tragedies that war gives rise to, rather than seeking to glamorize it as a heroic struggle between competing nations. It emphasizes that war is society's failure to perform its most important duty: to protect its own people.

However, Takahata repeatedly denied that the film was an anti-war film. In his own words, it "is not at all an anti-war anime and contains absolutely no such message". Instead, Takahata had intended to convey an image of the brother and sister living a failed life due to isolation from society and invoke sympathy particularly in people in their teens and twenties. He also noted, "That was an era when an extremely oppressive form of 'totalitarianism'—the absolute worst kind of social order—was accepted as the norm. Seita resists that totalitarian era and tries to build a 'pure family' with just Setsuko, but is such a thing even possible? Because it isn't, Seita ends up causing Setsuko's death. But can we really criticize him for that? It is because the times have reversed that we modern people find it easy to empathize with Seita emotionally. If the times were to reverse again someday, an era might come where the majority of opinions condemn Seita even more harshly than that widow (his aunt), and that terrifies me." He further remarked, "Anyone could become a person like the woman from Nishinomiya. I want the audience to be frightened by that".

Since the 2000s, there have been reports of a self-responsibility-based interpretation of Seita's death as "deserved." Regarding this, Seiji Kanō pointed out, "Takahata believed that both a self-responsibility perspective and a sympathetic reception of Seita were possible, but he aimed to create a 'useful film'—not as an extreme argument, but one that, based on the logic behind each character's actions, goes beyond the issues of Seita and his aunt alone to serve as material for discussing at what stage the tragedy could have been avoided."

Since the film gives little context to the war, Takahata feared a politician could just as easily claim fighting is needed to avoid such tragedies. In general, he was skeptical that depictions of suffering in similar works, such as Barefoot Gen, actually prevent aggression. According to Kanō, Takahata reportedly said, "This film cannot stop war. If a film is to advocate against war, it is necessary to urge the audience to take action by asking, 'What should we do before war breaks out?'" The director was nevertheless an anti-war advocate, a staunch supporter of Article 9 of the Japanese Constitution, and has openly criticized Japan's penchant for conformity, allowing them to be rallied against other nations. He expressed despair and anxiety whenever the youth are told to fall in line, a reminder that the country at its core has not changed.

Despite the public's emotional reaction, Takahata expressed that the purpose of the film was not to be a tragedy or make people cry. Moreover, he regretted depicting Seita as a boy from that era because he wanted him to come off as a contemporary boy who acted like he had time-traveled to the period. He did not intend for it to be retrospective or nostalgic. He wanted the Japanese audience to recognize Seita's misguided attempts to withdraw from society and family. Furthermore, he says that his decision to show the audience that Seita and Setsuko have died at the beginning of the movie is to protect the audience from heartbreak, "If an audience knows at the beginning of the film that the two will eventually die, they are more prepared to watch the film in the first place. I try to lessen an audience's pain by revealing everything at the beginning." Additionally, the dual narrative structure—in which Seita, now a ghost, watches his own final moments—adds an objective perspective. Through these directorial choices, the audience naturally witnesses the fate of the siblings in the main story from the same viewpoint as the ghosts Seita and Setsuko, observing their lives objectively.

The fireflies in the film are portrayed as symbols of various themes such as the spirits of the lost children, the fires that burned the towns, Japanese soldiers, the machinery of war, and the regeneration of life through nature. Okypo Moon states in her essay "Marketing Nature in Rural Japan", that hundreds of fireflies were caught nightly in the 1920s and 1930s. In the 1960s and 1970s, there was a shift to reinstate this tradition and "there are now eighty five 'firefly villages' (hotaru no sato) registered at the Ministry of the Environment in Japan. The movie uses fireflies to visually represent both deadly and beautiful imagery, such as fire-bombs and kamikazes. For the word "firefly" in the title, Takahata chooses to use the kanji "drops of fire" (火垂る) instead of the normal character (蛍) which is often used for fluorescent lamps, which has been interpreted to represent the widespread burning of wooden houses in Japan or the incendiary bombs raining from Boeing B-29 Superfortresses; one of which is shown in the background of the marketing poster of the movie. Critic Dennis H. Fukushima Jr. believes that this modification of the title is to emphasize parallels between beauty and devastation, citing the relationship between fireflies, M-69 incendiary bombs, naval vessels, city lights, and human spirits.

In the book Imag(in)ing the War in Japan, David Stahl and Mark Williams commend the film for not emphasizing Japanese victimhood to avoid responsibility for atrocities of the war they played a role in. They interpret that Seita's character embodies working towards healing historical trauma and victimization, because it is his nationalistic pride and selfishness which ultimately contributed to his sister's death.

== Release ==
=== Theatrical ===
The film was released on 16 April 1988, over 20 years from the publication of the short story.

The initial Japanese theatrical release was accompanied by Hayao Miyazaki's light-hearted My Neighbor Totoro as a double feature. While the two films were marketed toward children and their parents, the starkly tragic nature of Grave of the Fireflies turned away many audiences. However, Totoro merchandise, particularly Totoro and Catbus stuffed toys, sold extremely well after the film and made overall profits for the company to the extent that it stabilized subsequent productions of Studio Ghibli.

Grave of the Fireflies is the only theatrical Studio Ghibli feature film prior to From Up on Poppy Hill to which Disney never had North American distribution rights, since it was not produced by Ghibli for parent company Tokuma Shoten but for Shinchosha, the publisher of the original short story (although Disney has the Japanese home video distribution rights themselves, thus replacing the film's original Japanese home video distributor, Bandai Visual). It was one of the last Studio Ghibli films to get an English-language premiere by GKIDS.

=== Home media and streaming ===
Grave of the Fireflies was released on VHS in Japan by Buena Vista Home Entertainment under the Ghibli ga Ippai Collection label on 7 August 1998. On 29 July 2005, a DVD release was distributed through Warner Home Video. Walt Disney Studios Japan released the complete collector's edition DVD on 6 August 2008. WDSJ released the film on Blu-ray twice on 18 July 2012: one as a single release, and one in a two-film set with My Neighbor Totoro (even though Disney has never owned the North American rights, only the Japanese rights).

It was released on VHS in North America by Central Park Media in a subtitled form on 2 June 1993. They later released the film with an English dub on VHS on 1 September 1998 (the day Disney released Kiki's Delivery Service) and an all-Regions DVD (which also included the original Japanese with English subtitles) on 7 October 1998. On 8 October 2002, it was later released on a two-disc DVD set, which once again included both the English dub and the original Japanese with English subtitles as well as the film's storyboards with the second disc containing a retrospective on the author of the original book, an interview with the director, and an interview with critic Roger Ebert, who felt the film was one of the greatest of all time. It was released by Central Park Media one last time on 7 December 2004. Following the May 2009 bankruptcy and liquidation of Central Park Media, ADV Films re-acquired the rights to the film from Central Park Media and re-released on DVD on 7 July 2009. Following the 1 September 2009 shutdown and re-branding of ADV, their successor, Sentai Filmworks, rescued the film and released a remastered DVD on 6 March 2012, and planned to release the film on digital outlets. A Blu-ray edition was released on 20 November 2012, featuring an all-new English dub produced by Seraphim Digital. GKIDS re-acquired the rights to the film from Sentai Filmworks and re-released it through home media partner Shout! Studios on Blu-ray and DVD on 8 July 2025, under a new deal with Studio Ghibli (which has the original Japanese version and the 1998 and 2012 English dubs).

StudioCanal UK released the film on Blu-ray in the United Kingdom on 1 July 2013, followed by Kiki's Delivery Service on the same format. It was the UK's tenth annual best-selling foreign language film on home video in 2019 (below seven other Japanese films, including six of Hayao Miyazaki's films). In August 2025, Anime Limited acquired the British and Irish distribution rights to the film, announcing that a new Blu-ray release would occur in 2026 after its theatrical release.

Madman Entertainment released the film in Australia and New Zealand.

On 16 September 2024, the film started streaming exclusively on Netflix in over 190 countries, excluding Japan (which was until the film started streaming exclusively on Netflix on 15 July 2025), as part of ongoing efforts to expand the platform's extensive lineup of Japanese films and TV shows.

== Reception ==
=== Box office and home video ===
The film was modestly successful at the Japanese box office, where it grossed ¥1.7 billion. As part of the Studio Ghibli Fest 2018, the film had a limited theatrical release in the United States, grossing US$516,962. With subsequent international releases, the film grossed a total of $4,696,907 overseas between 2018 and 2025.

The Ghibli ga Ippai Collection home video release of Grave of the Fireflies sold 400,000 copies in Japan. At a price of at least ¥4,935, this is equivalent to at least ¥1.974 billion in sales revenue.

=== Critical reception ===
The film received universal critical acclaim. The film review aggregator website Rotten Tomatoes reported a 100% approval rating based on 49 reviews, with an average rating of 9.3/10. The website's critical consensus reads, "An achingly sad anti-war film, Grave of the Fireflies is one of Studio Ghibli's most profoundly beautiful, haunting works." Metacritic assigned the film a score of 94 out of 100 based on 16 reviews, indicating "universal acclaim".

Roger Ebert of the Chicago Sun-Times considered it to be one of the best and most powerful war films ever made, and included it on his list of great films in 2000.

Japanese filmmaker Akira Kurosawa praised the film and considered it his favourite Studio Ghibli production. He wrote a letter of praise to the studio's founder Hayao Miyazaki, mistakenly believing he had directed it. Miyazaki himself praised the film as Takahata's masterpiece, but criticized the character of Seita for not behaving how he believed the son of a navy lieutenant should have behaved.

The film was ranked at No. 12 on Total Film's list of the "50 Greatest Animated Movies", No. 10 on Time Out's list of the "50 Greatest World War II Movies", No. 6 on Empire's list of the "Top 10 Depressing Movies", and No. 19 on Wizard's Anime's list of the "Top 50 Anime released in North America". Bangladeshi newspaper The Daily Star ranked the film at No. 4 on its list of the "10 Must-Watch Short Story Adaptations" and wrote, "There is both much and little to say about the film. It is simply an experience—a trip through the lonely boroughs of humanity that the world collectively looked, and still looks, away from." Reviewing the original U.S. Manga Corps dub of the film, Theron Martin of Anime News Network said that while the other voices were perfectly acceptable, "Setsuko just doesn't sound quite convincing as a four-year-old in English. That, unfortunately, is a big negative, since a good chunk of the pathos the movie delivers is at least partly dependent on that performance."

In June 2018, USA Today ranked it 1st on the 100 best animated movies of all time. In 2022, the film was ranked 225th on Sight & Sound's Greatest Films list (Critics + Directors' combined poll), being one of the only three animated films to make the top 250 (alongside My Neighbor Totoro and Spirited Away).

Film director and critic Haruo Mizuno reviewed Grave of the Fireflies on his popular TV series. He praised the film for the honorary image of the soldiers of Japan through the depiction of the fireflies, and the moving depiction of a heartbreaking experience many people of Japan had lived through.

=== Public reaction ===
After the international release, it has been noted that different audiences have interpreted the film differently due to differences in culture. For instance, when the film was watched by a Japanese audience, Seita's decision to not come back to his aunt was seen as an understandable decision, because it was understood how Seita had been raised to value pride in himself and his country. Conversely, American and Australian audiences were more likely to perceive the decision as unwise.

=== Accolades ===
Year	Award	Category	Recipient	Result
1989	Blue Ribbon Awards	Special Award	Isao Takahata	Won
1994	Chicago International Children's Film Festival	Animation Jury Award	Isao Takahata	Won
1994	Chicago International Children's Film Festival	Rights of the Child Award	Isao Takahata	Won

== Derivative works ==
=== Planned follow-up ===
Following the success of Grave of the Fireflies, Takahata drew up an outline for a follow-up film, based on similar themes but set in 1939 at the start of the Pacific War. This film was called Border 1939, based on the novel The Border by Shin Shikata, and would have told the story of a Japanese teenager from colonial Seoul joining an anti-Japanese resistance group in Mongolia. The film was intended as an indictment of Japanese imperialist sentiment, which is briefly touched upon in Grave of the Fireflies. Although Takahata finished a full outline (which is republished in his book Thoughts While Making Movies), the film was canceled before production could start due to the 1989 Tiananmen Square protests and massacre. Public opinion in Japan had turned against China, and Ghibli's distributor felt a film partly set there was too risky.

=== 2005 live-action version ===
NTV in Japan produced a live-action TV drama of Grave of the Fireflies, in commemoration of the 60th anniversary of the end of World War II. The drama aired on 1 November 2005. Like the animated film, the live-action version of Grave of the Fireflies focuses on two siblings struggling to survive the final months of the war in Kobe, Japan. However, unlike the animated version, it tells the story from the point of view of their cousin (the aunt's daughter) and deals with the issue of how the wartime environment could change a kind lady into a hard-hearted woman. The film stars Nanako Matsushima as the aunt and Mao Inoue as the cousin (who also portrays the cousin's granddaughter).

=== 2008 live-action version ===
A second live-action version was released in Japan on 5 July 2008, featuring Reo Yoshitake as Seita, Rina Hatakeyama as Setsuko, Keiko Matsuzaka as the aunt, and Seiko Matsuda as the children's mother. Like the animated film, this live-action version of Grave of the Fireflies focuses on two siblings struggling to survive the final months of the war in Kobe, Japan.

== See also ==
- Air raids on Japan during the war
- Evacuations of civilians in Japan during World War II
- Barefoot Gen, a manga series set in the aftermath of the atomic bombing of Hiroshima.
- Fragile Dreams: Farewell Ruins of the Moon, a video game with similarities to the film.
- List of films with a 100% rating on Rotten Tomatoes
- When the Wind Blows, a 1986 British animated film.
