= Thomas Havens =

American historian (born 1939)

Thomas Robert Hamilton Havens (born November 21, 1939) is an American Japanologist.

Havens is from Chambersburg, Pennsylvania, and graduated from Princeton University in 1961 with a Bachelor of Arts degree in history, followed by a master's degree from the University of California, Berkeley, in 1962. He remained at Berkeley to earn a doctorate in history in 1965, and began his teaching career at University of Toronto before moving to Connecticut College in 1966. While on the Connecticut College faculty, he was awarded a Guggenheim fellowship in 1976. Havens joined the University of Illinois Urbana-Champaign faculty in 1990, where he taught for two years before accepting a teaching position at Berkeley. Havens served as a faculty member for his alma mater for six years, then in 1999, moved to Northeastern University.

He is married to Karen Thornber, the Harry Tuchman Levin Professor in Literature and professor of East Asian languages and civilizations at Harvard University.

== Selected publications ==
- Havens, Thomas R. H. (1970). Nishi Amane and Modern Japanese Thought. Princeton University Press. ISBN 9780691030807.
- Havens, Thomas R. H. (1974). Farm and Nation in Modern Japan: Agrarian Nationalism, 1879-1940. Princeton University Press. ISBN 9780691031019.
- Havens, Thomas R. H. (1978). Valley of Darkness: The Japanese People and World War Two. W. W. Norton. ISBN 9780819154958.
- Havens, Thomas R. H. (1982). Artist and Patron in Postwar Japan, Dance, Music, Theater, and the Visual Arts, 1955-1980. Princeton University Press. ISBN 9780691053639.
- Havens, Thomas R. H. (1987). Fire Across the Sea: The Vietnam War and Japan 1965-1975. Princeton University Press. ISBN 9780691008110.
- Havens, Thomas R. H. (1994). Architects of Affluence: The Tsutsumi Family and the Seibu Enterprises in Twentieth-Century Japan. Harvard University Press. ISBN 9781684173068.
- Havens, Thomas R. H. (2006). Radicals and Realists in the Japanese Nonverbal Arts: The Avant-Garde Rejection of Modernism. University of Hawaii Press. ISBN 9780824830113.
- Havens, Thomas R. H. (2010). Parkscapes: Green Spaces in Modern Japan. University of Hawaii Press. ISBN 9780824834777.
- Havens, Thomas R. H. (2015). Marathon Japan: Distance Racing and Civic Culture. University of Hawaii Press. ISBN 9780824841010.
- Havens, Thomas R. H. (2020). Land of Plants in Motion: Japanese Botany and the World. University of Hawaii Press. ISBN 9780824882891.
