= Bombing of Kobe in World War II =

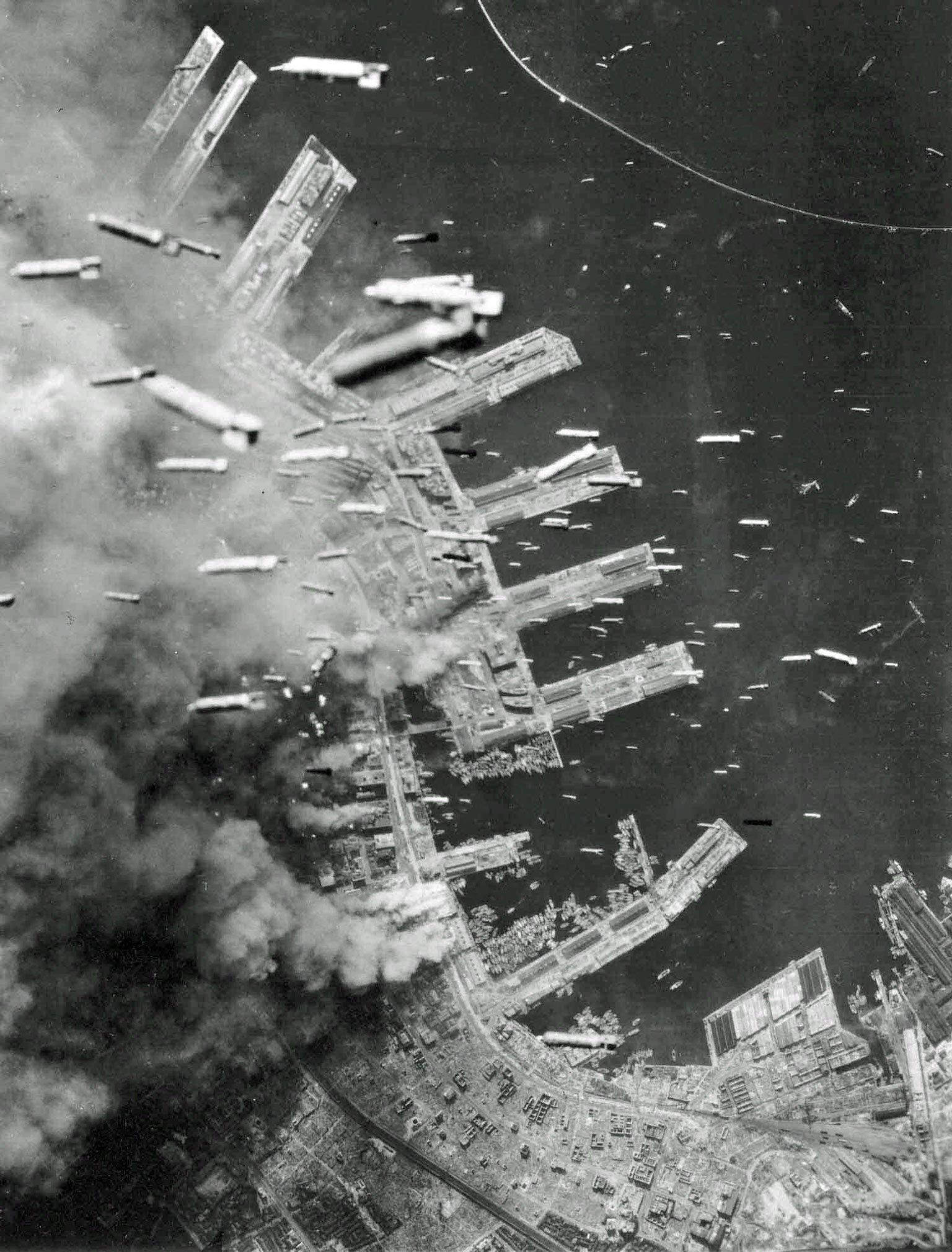
Incendiary bombs rain down over the city of Kobe, June 5, 1945

The bombing of Kobe (Kōbe dai-kūshū) on March 16 and 17, 1945, was part of the strategic bombing air raids on Japan campaign waged by the United States against military and civilian targets and population centers during the Japan home islands campaign in the closing stages of the Pacific War. The city would be bombed again in later months.

== Background ==
Kobe was the sixth-largest city in Japan at the time, with a population of roughly 1 million. The houses were mostly built with wood and thus highly flammable, suitable for starting and sustaining large fires. Second, it was Japan's largest port, home to the largest concentration of shipbuilding and marine-engine manufacturing. Kobe was also an important city for transportation and business. National highways ran through the city, especially through the congested business section, and Kobe contained business facilities for steel, machinery, rubber, railway equipment, and ordnance. Lastly, Kobe's low water supply, consisting of only three reservoirs, and its poor firefighting equipment created a very fire-prone environment.

== Bombing raids ==
=== February 4 raid ===
After trials on the Japanese Village set on the Dugway Proving Grounds, Curtis LeMay of the United States Army Air Forces ordered Boeing B-29 Superfortress bombers to drop incendiary bombs to burn Japan's mostly wood-and-paper houses, in an "experimental" carpet bombing raid against Kobe on 4 February 1945.

=== March 16–17 raid ===
On March 16–17, 331 American B-29 bombers launched a firebombing attack against the city of Kobe. This raid was executed by all three wings of the XXI Bomber Command, namely the 73rd, 313th, and 314th Bombardment wings. It was flown in honor of Brigadier General LaVerne Saunders, who was, at the time, recuperating in Walter Reed General Hospital from injuries he sustained during an aircraft accident. The raid targeted four key areas: the northwest corner of the city, the area south of the main railroad line, the area northwest of the main railroad station, and the area northeast of the third target. Of the city's residents, 8,841 were confirmed to have been killed in the resulting firestorms, which destroyed an area of three square miles—21% of Kobe's urban area. At the time, the city covered an area of 14 square miles (36 km^{2}). More than 650,000 people had their homes destroyed, and the homes of another million people were damaged.

During the raid, 280 Japanese fighters were spotted, 96 of which engaged the B-29 bombers in 128 attacks; this constituted a higher proportion of fighters sighted to those attacking than previously experienced during a night raid over Japan. Three bombers were lost during the raid, but the reason/s for their losses is/are unknown. Two of the airmen in the downed aircraft, Sergeant Algy S. Augunas and Second Lieutenant Robert E. Copeland, survived and were captured by the Japanese. They were subsequently tried by a hastily convened court for the "indiscriminate bombing" of Kobe and Osaka, sentenced to death, and executed by firing squad.

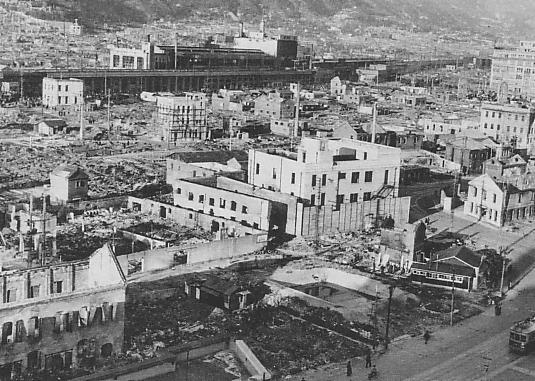
After the bombing of Kobe

=== Other raids ===
On June 5 that same year, Kobe was bombed again. Incendiaries dropped from 530 bombers destroyed 3.8 square miles (9.8 km^{2}) of the city, and 51% of the built-up area of the city was damaged.

In addition to incendiary attacks, Kobe was the target of a B-29 precision attack on industry, three mine-laying operations, and one fighter-bomber swoop:

- 11 May 1945: 92 B-29s hit Kawanishi aircraft industry
- 18 June 1945: 25 B-29s laid naval mines in several areas, including waters near Kobe
- 28 June 1945: 29 B-29s laid naval mines in three harbors, including Kobe's
- 19 July 1945: 27 B-29s laid naval mines in several areas, including waters near Kobe
- 30 July 1945: Fighters attacked airfields, railroads, and tactical targets throughout Kobe/Osaka area

== See also ==
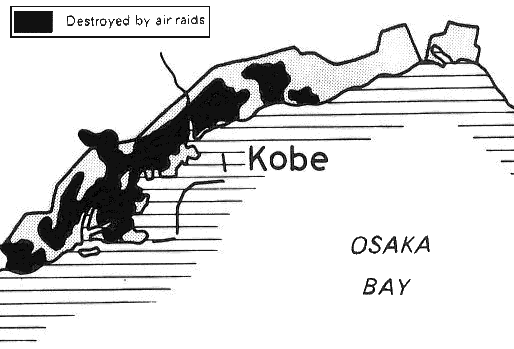
Extent of destroyed areas of Kobe as surveyed in 1946

- Air raids on Japan
- Bombing of Tokyo
- Evacuations of civilians in Japan during World War II
- Grave of the Fireflies (short story), a semi-autobiographical short story set during the bombing
  - Grave of the Fireflies, an anime film based on the novel
