= Outline of the Pacific War =

Flags indicate the country, or countries, winning the offensive.

== Second Sino-Japanese war ==
Before 1942 and inclusion in the Pacific War:

- (Empire of Japan) 1937-07-07 – 1937-07-09 Marco Polo Bridge incident
- (Empire of Japan) 1937-08-13 – 1937-11-26 Battle of Shanghai
- (Empire of Japan) 1937-09-01 – 1937-11-09 Battle of Taiyuan
- (Empire of Japan) 1937-12-09 – 1938-01-31 Battle of Nanking
- (Empire of Japan) 1938-03-24 – 1938-05-01 Battle of Xuzhou
- (Empire of Japan) 1938-06-11 – 1938-10-27 Battle of Wuhan
- (Empire of Japan) 1939-03-17 – 1939-05-09 Battle of Nanchang
- (Republic of China (1912–1949)) 1939-04-20 – 1939-05-24 Battle of Suixian–Zaoyang
- (Republic of China (1912–1949)) 1939-09-13 – 1939-10-08 Battle of Changsha (1939)
- (Republic of China (1912–1949)) 1939-11-15 – 1940-11-30 Battle of South Guangxi
- (Republic of China (1912–1949)) 1940-05-01 – 1940-06-18 Battle of Zaoyang–Yichang
- (Republic of China (1912–1949)) 1940-08-20 – 1940-12-05 Hundred Regiments Offensive
- (Republic of China (1912–1949)) 1941-01-30 – 1941-03-01 Battle of South Henan
- (Republic of China (1912–1949)) 1941-03-14 – 1941-04-09 Battle of Shanggao
- (Empire of Japan) 1941-05-07 – 1941-05-27 Battle of South Shanxi
- (Republic of China (1912–1949)) 1941-09-06 – 1941-10-08 Battle of Changsha (1941)

After inclusion in the Pacific War:

- (Republic of China (1912–1949)) 1941-12-24 – 1942-01-15 Battle of Changsha (1941–1942)
- (Empire of Japan) 1942-05-14 – 1942-09-07 Zhejiang-Jiangxi campaign
- (Republic of China (1912–1949)) (United States) 1943-05-12 – 1943-06-03 Battle of West Hubei
- (Republic of China (1912–1949)) 1943-11-02 – 1943-12-20 Battle of Changde
- (Empire of Japan) 1944-04-17 – 1944-12-10 Operation Ichi-Go
- (Empire of Japan) 1945-03-21 – 1945-05-11 Battle of West Henan–North Hubei
- (Republic of China (1912–1949)) (United States) 1945-04-09 – 1945-06-07 Battle of West Hunan
- (Republic of China (1912–1949)) 1945-04-18 — 1945-08-04 Second Guangxi campaign

(Empire of Japan) Franco-Japanese Border War

- 1940-09-22 – 1940-09-25 Battle of Lạng Sơn
- 1940-09-24 – 1940-09-26 Bombing of Hải Phòng

(Thailand) Franco-Thai War

- October 1940 – 9 May 1941

(Soviet Union) Soviet–Japanese border conflicts

- 1938-07-29 – 1938-08-11 Battle of Lake Khasan
- 1939-05-11 – 1939-09-16 Battles of Khalkhin Gol

== Japanese conquest of Southeast Asia and Pacific ==
- (Empire of Japan) 1941-12-07 (12-08 Asian Time) Attack on Pearl Harbor
- (Empire of Japan) 1941-12-08 Japanese invasion of Thailand
- (Empire of Japan) 1941-12-08 Battle of Guam (1941)
- 1941-12-07 Japan declares war on the United States and the United Kingdom; 1941-12-08 The United States and the United Kingdom declare war on Japan
- (Empire of Japan) 1941-12-08 – 1941-12-25 Battle of Hong Kong
- (Empire of Japan) 1941-12-08 – 1942-01-31 Malayan Campaign
- (Empire of Japan) 1941-12-10 Sinking of HMS Prince of Wales and HMS Repulse
- (Empire of Japan) 1941-12-11 – 1941-12-24 Battle of Wake Island
- (Empire of Japan) 1941-12-16 – 1942-04-01 Battle of Borneo (1941–42)
- (Empire of Japan) 1941-12-22 – 1942-05-06 Battle of the Philippines
- 1942-01-01 – 1945-10-25 Transport of POWs via hell ships
- (Empire of Japan) 1942-01-11 – 1942-01-12 Battle of Tarakan
- (Empire of Japan) 1942-01-23 Battle of Rabaul (1942)
- (Empire of Japan) 1942-01-24 Battle of Balikpapan
- 1942-01-25 Thailand declares war on the Allies
- (Empire of Japan) 1942-01-30 – 1942-02-03 Battle of Ambon
- (Empire of Japan) 1942-01-30 – 1942-02-15 Battle of Singapore
- (Empire of Japan) 1942-02-04 Battle of Makassar Strait
- (Empire of Japan) 1942-02-14 – 1942-02-15 Battle of Palembang
- (Empire of Japan) 1942-02-19 Air raids on Darwin, Australia
- (Empire of Japan) 1942-02-19 – 1942-02-20 Battle of Badung Strait
- (Empire of Japan) 1942-02-19 – 1943-02-10 Battle of Timor
- (Empire of Japan) 1942-02-27 – 1942-03-01 Battle of the Java Sea
- (Empire of Japan) 1942-03-01 Battle of Sunda Strait
- (Empire of Japan) 1942-03-01 – 1942-03-09 Battle of Java
- (Empire of Japan) 1942-03-31 Battle of Christmas Island
- (Empire of Japan) 1942-03-31 – 1942-04-10 Indian Ocean raid
- 1942-04-09 Bataan Death March begins
- (United States) 1942-04-18 Doolittle Raid
- (Empire of Japan) 1942-05-03 Japanese invasion of Tulagi
- (Australia) (United States) 1942-05-04 – 1942-05-08 Battle of the Coral Sea
- (Empire of Japan) 1942-05-31 – 1942-06-08 Attacks on Sydney Harbour area, Australia
- (United States) 1942-06-04 – 1942-06-06 Battle of Midway

== Allied offensives ==
See Atlas of the World Battle Fronts
1943-07-01	1943-12-01	1944-05-01
1944-11-01	1945-03-01	1945-08-01

South East Asian campaigns: 1941-12-08 – 1945-08-15

- (Republic of China (1912–1949)) (United Kingdom) (India) (Canada) (United States) Burma campaign: 1941-12-16 – 1945-08-15
- (Republic of China (1912–1949)) (United States) October 1943 – March 1945 Battle of Northern Burma and Western Yunnan
- (United Kingdom) 1945-05-15 – 1945-05-16 Battle of the Malacca Strait

New Guinea campaign

- (Empire of Japan) 1942-01-23 – Battle of Rabaul
- 1942-03-07 – Operation Mo (Japanese invasion of mainland New Guinea)
- (Australia) (United States) 1942-05-04 – 1942-05-08 Battle of the Coral Sea
- (Australia) 1942-07-01 – 1943-01-31 Kokoda Track Campaign
- (Australia) (United States) 1942-08-25 – 1942-09-05 Battle of Milne Bay
- (Australia) (United States) 1942-11-19 – 1943-01-23 Battle of Buna-Gona
- (Australia) (United States) 1943-01-28 – 1943-01-30 Battle of Wau
- (Australia) (United States) 1943-03-02 – 1943-03-04 Battle of the Bismarck Sea
- (Australia) (United States) 1943-06-29 – 1943-09-16 Battle of Lae
- (Australia) (New Zealand) (United States) 1943-06-30 – 1944-03-25 Operation Cartwheel
- (Australia) (United States) 1943-09-19 – 1944-04-24 Finisterre Range campaign
- (Australia) (United States) 1943-09-22 – 1944-01-15 Huon Peninsula campaign
- (Australia) (New Zealand) (United States) 1943-11-01 – 1943-11-11 Attack on Rabaul
- (Australia) (New Zealand) (United States) 1943-12-15 – 1945-08-15 New Britain campaign
- (United States) 1944-02-29 – 1944-03-25 Admiralty Islands campaign
- (Australia) (United States) 1944-04-22 – 1945-08-15 Western New Guinea campaign

Madagascar Campaign

- (United Kingdom) (Southern Rhodesia) (South Africa) (Australia) 1942-05-05 – 1942-11-06 Battle of Madagascar

Aleutian Islands campaign

- (Canada) (United States) 1942-06-06 – 1943-08-15 Battle of the Aleutian Islands
- (Canada) (United States) 1942-06-07 – 1943-08-15 Battle of Kiska
- (United States) 1943-03-26 – Battle of the Komandorski Islands

Guadalcanal campaign

- (Australia) (New Zealand) (United States) (Tonga) 1942-08-07 – 1943-02-09 Battle of Guadalcanal
- (Empire of Japan) 1942-08-09 Battle of Savo Island
- (Australia) (United States) 1942-08-24 – 1942-08-25 Battle of the Eastern Solomons
- (United States) 1942-10-11 – 1942-10-12 Battle of Cape Esperance
- 1942-10-25 – 1942-10-27 Battle of the Santa Cruz Islands
- (Australia) (United States) 1942-11-13 – 1942-11-15 Naval Battle of Guadalcanal
- (Empire of Japan) 1942-11-30 Battle of Tassafaronga

Solomon Islands campaign

- (Empire of Japan) 1943-01-29 – 1943-01-30 Battle of Rennell Island
- (United States) 1943-03-06 Battle of Blackett Strait
- (Australia) (New Zealand) (United States) (Fiji) 1943-06-10 – 1943-08-25 New Georgia campaign
- 1943-07-06 Battle of Kula Gulf
- (Empire of Japan) 1943-07-12 – 1943-07-13 Battle of Kolombangara
- (United States) 1943-08-06 – 1943-08-07 Battle of Vella Gulf
- (Japan) 1943-08-17 – 1943-08-18 Battle off Horaniu
- (New Zealand) (United States) (Fiji) 1943-08-15 – 1943-10-09 Battle of Vella Lavella (land)
- (Empire of Japan) 1943-10-06 Battle of Vella Lavella (naval)
- (Australia) (New Zealand) (United States) (Fiji) 1943-11-01 – 1945-08-21 Bougainville campaign
- (United States) 1943-11-01 – 1943-11-02 Battle of Empress Augusta Bay
- (United States) 1943-11-26 Battle of Cape St. George

Gilbert and Marshall Islands campaign

- (United States) 1943-11-20 – 1943-11-23 Battle of Tarawa
- (United States) 1943-11-20 – 1943-11-24 Battle of Makin
- (United States) 1944-01-31 – 1944-02-07 Battle of Kwajalein
- (United States) 1944-02-16 – 1944-02-17 Attack on Truk
- (United States) 1944-02-16 – 1944-02-23 Battle of Eniwetok

Bombing of South East Asia, 1944-45

- (United Kingdom) (United States) Operation Cockpit 1944-04-19
- (United Kingdom) (United States) Operation Transom 1944-05-17
- (United Kingdom) (United States) Bombing of Bangkok 1944-05-20
- (United States) Operation Matterhorn 1944-06-05 – May 1945
- (United Kingdom) Operation Meridian 1945-01-24 – 1945-01-29

Mariana and Palau Islands campaign

- (United States) 1944-10-12 - 1944-10-16 Formosa Air Battle
- (United States) 1944-06-15 – 1944-07-09 Battle of Saipan
- (United States) 1944-06-19 – 1944-06-20 Battle of the Philippine Sea
- (United States) 1944-07-21 – 1944-08-10 Battle of Guam
- (United States) 1944-07-24 – 1944-08-01 Battle of Tinian
- (United States) 1944-09-15 – 1944-11-25 Battle of Peleliu
- (United States) 1944-09-17 – 1944-09-30 Battle of Angaur

Philippines campaign

- (Australia) (Commonwealth of the Philippines) (United States) 1944-10-20 – 1944-12-10 Battle of Leyte
- (Australia) (United States) 1944-10-24 – 1944-10-25 Battle of Leyte Gulf
- (United States) (Commonwealth of the Philippines) 1944-10-25 battle off Samar
- (United States) 1944-11-11 – 1944-12-21 Battle of Ormoc Bay
- (United States) (Commonwealth of the Philippines) 1944-12-13 - 1944-12-16 Battle of Mindoro
- (Mexico) (Commonwealth of the Philippines) (United States) 1944-12-15 – 1945-07-04 Battle of Luzon
- (Australia) (United States) 1945-01-09 Invasion of Lingayen Gulf
- (Commonwealth of the Philippines) (United States) 1945-01-31 – 1945-02-08 Recapture of Bataan
- (Commonwealth of the Philippines) (United States) 1945-02-03 – 1945-03-03 Battle of Manila
- (Commonwealth of the Philippines) (United States) 1945-03-18 – 1945-07-30 Battle of the Visayas
- (Commonwealth of the Philippines) (United States) 1945-03-10 – 1945-08-15 Battle of Mindanao

Volcano and Ryukyu Islands campaign

- (United States) 1945-02-16 – 1945-03-26 Battle of Iwo Jima
- (Australia) (Canada) (New Zealand) (United Kingdom) (United States) 1945-04-01 – 1945-06-21 Battle of Okinawa
- (United States) 1945-04-07 Operation Ten-Go

Borneo campaign

- (Australia) (Netherlands) (United States) 1945-05-01 – 1945-05-25 Battle of Tarakan
- (Australia) 1945-06-10 – 1945-06-15 Battle of Brunei
- (Australia) 1945-06-10 – 1945-06-22 Battle of Labuan
- (Australia) 1945-06-17 – 1945-08-15 Battle of North Borneo
- (Australia) (United States) 1945-07-07 – 1945-07-21 Battle of Balikpapan

Japan campaign

- (United States) 1945-07-22 Battle of Tokyo Bay
- (United States) 1945-08-06 – 1945-08-09 Atomic bombings of Hiroshima and Nagasaki

Soviet invasion of Manchuria

- (Soviet Union) 1945-08-08 – 1945-09-02 Soviet invasion of Manchuria

== Campaigns ==
=== East Asia ===
- Second Sino-Japanese War
  - Marco Polo Bridge incident
  - Battle of Beiping–Tianjin
  - Operation Chahar
  - Battle of Shanghai
    - Battle of the Sihang Warehouse
  - Battle of Jianqiao
  - Beiping–Hankou Railway campaign
  - Tianjin–Pukou Railway campaign
  - Battle of Taiyuan
    - Battle of Xinkou
    - Battle of Pingxingguan
  - Battle of Nanking
    - USS Panay incident
  - Battle of Xuzhou
    - Battle of Taierzhuang
  - Battle of Northern and Eastern Henan
    - Battle of Lanfeng
  - Bombing of Chongqing
  - Battle of Xiamen
  - Battle of Wuhan
    - Battle of Wanjialing
  - Dongwuling Ambush (1938)
  - Battle of Xinfeng
  - Canton campaign
  - Hainan Island campaign
  - Battle of Nanchang
  - Battle of Suixian–Zaoyang
  - Swatow campaign
  - East Shanxi campaign
  - First Battle of Changsha
  - Battle of South Guangxi
    - Battle of Kunlun Pass
  - 1939–1940 Winter Offensive
    - Battle of Baotou
    - Battle of West Suiyuan
    - Battle of Wuyuan
  - Battle of South Shanxi
  - Battle of Zaoyang–Yichang
  - Hundred Regiments campaign
    - Battle of Guanjianao
  - Central Hubei campaign
  - Battle of South Henan
  - Western Hubei campaign
  - Battle of Shanggao
  - Battle of South Shanxi
  - Second Battle of Changsha
  - Third Battle of Changsha
  - Zhejiang-Jiangxi campaign
  - Taihang Mountains campaign
  - Battle of West Hubei
  - Linnan campaign
  - Battle of Changde
  - Operation Ichi-Go
    - Battle of Changsha
      - Battle of Hengyang
    - Battle of Lingbao
    - Battle of Guilin–Liuzhou
  - Battle of West Henan–North Hubei
  - Battle of West Hunan
  - Second Guangxi campaign
- Japan campaign
  - Bombing of Yahata
  - Bombing of Nagoya
  - Volcano and Ryukyu Islands campaign
    - Battle of Iwo Jima
    - Battle of Okinawa
      - Operation Kikusui
        - Operation Kikusui I
  - Bombing of Tokyo
  - Bombing of Kobe
  - Bombing of Osaka
  - Bombing of Kure
  - Operation Starvation
  - Bombing of Hamamatsu
  - Bombing of Yokkaichi
  - Bombing of Fukuoka
  - Bombing of Shizuoka
  - Bombing of Toyohashi
  - Bombing of Kōfu
  - Bombing of Gifu
  - Bombing of Sendai
  - Bombing of Utsunomiya
  - Naval bombardment of Japan
  - Bombing of Hiratsuka
  - Bombing of Numazu
  - Bombing of Yokosuka
  - Bombing of Fukui
  - Bombing of Okazaki
  - Battle of Sagami Bay
  - Bombing of Aomori
  - Bombing of Nagaoka
  - Atomic bombings of Hiroshima and Nagasaki
  - Bombing of Toyokawa
  - Bombing of Akita
  - Bombing of Kumagaya
- Soviet-Japanese War
  - Manchuria campaign
    - Harbin–Kirin campaign
      - Battle of Mutanchiang
    - Khingan–Mukden campaign
    - Sungari campaign
      - Siege of Hutou Fortress
  - South Sakhalin campaign
    - Battle of Toro
    - Battle of Maoka
  - Kuril Islands campaign
    - Battle of Shumshu

=== Southeast Asia ===
- Japanese invasion of French Indochina (22 September 1940 – 26 September 1940)
- Franco-Thai War (1 October 1940 – 9 May 1941)
  - Battle of Banphlao (16 January 1941)
  - Battle of Ko Chang (17 January 1941)
- Japanese invasion of Thailand (8 December 1941)
  - Battle of Prachuap Khiri Khan
- Bombing of Bangkok (7 January 1942 – 14 April 1945)
- Malayan campaign
  - Bombing of Singapore
  - Battle of Kota Bharu
  - Operation Krohcol
  - Sinking of Prince of Wales and Repulse
  - Battle of Jitra
  - Battle of Gurun
  - Battle of Kampar
  - Battle of Slim River
  - Battle of Muar
    - Battle of Gemas
  - Battle off Endau
  - Fall of Singapore
- Philippines campaign (1941–1942)
  - Attack on Clark Field
  - Japanese invasion of Batan Island
  - Japanese invasion of Vigan
  - Japanese invasion of Aparri
  - Japanese invasion of Legazpi
  - Japanese invasion of Davao
  - Battle of Digos
  - Japanese invasion of Lingayen Gulf
  - Japanese invasion of Lamon Bay
  - Battle of Bataan
  - Japanese invasion of Zamboanga
  - Japanese invasion of Cebu
  - Japanese invasion of Panay
  - Japanese invasion of Cotabato
  - Japanese invasion of Parang
  - Japanese invasion of Malabang
  - Japanese invasion of Cagayan de Oro
  - Battle of Corregidor
- Burma campaign
  - Japanese invasion of Burma
    - Battle of Bilin River
    - Battle of Sittang Bridge
    - Battle of Pegu
    - Battle of Taukkyan
    - Battle of the Yunnan–Burma Road
      - Battle of Tachiao
      - Battle of Oktwin
      - Battle of Toungoo
      - Battle of Yenangyaung
    - Battle of Prome
  - Battle of Arakan
  - Battle of Northern Burma and Western Yunnan
    - Siege of Myitkyina
    - Battle of Mogaung
    - Battle of Mount Song
  - Battle of the Admin Box
  - Operation U-Go
    - Battle of Sangshak
    - Battle of Imphal
    - Battle of Kohima
      - Battle of the Tennis Court
  - Battle of Ramree Island
  - Battle of Hill 170
  - Battle of Central Burma
  - Battle of Pokoku
  - Battle of Tanlwe Chaung
  - Operation Dracula
    - Battle of Elephant Point
  - Battle of the Sittang Bend
- Dutch East Indies campaign
  - Battle of Borneo
    - Battle of Tarakan
    - Battle of Balikpapan
    - Battle of Samarinda
    - Battle of Banjarmasin
  - Battle of Manado
  - Battle of Kendari
  - Battle of Ambon
  - Battle of Makassar Strait
  - Fall of the Riau Islands
  - Invasion of Sumatra
    - Battle of Palembang
  - Battle of Badung Strait
  - Battle of Timor
  - Battle of the Java Sea
  - Battle of Sunda Strait
  - Battle of Java
  - Second Battle of the Java Sea
- Philippines campaign (1944–1945)
  - Convoy Hi-71
  - Sinking of the Shin'yō Maru
  - Battle of the Taiwan Sea
  - Battle of Leyte
    - Battle of Ormoc Bay
  - Battle of Leyte Gulf
  - Convoy Hi-81
  - Battle of Mindoro
  - Operation Gratitude
  - Raid on Penghu
  - Battle of Luzon
    - Invasion of Lingayen Gulf
    - Raid on Cabanatuan
    - Battle of Bataan
    - Battle of Manila
    - Battle of Corregidor
    - Battle of Kirang Pass
    - Battle of Baguio
    - Raid on Los Baños
    - Battle of Wawa Dam
    - Battle of Villa Verde Trail
    - Battle of Bacsil Ridge
    - Battle of Bessang Pass
    - Battle of Mayoyao Ridge
  - Invasion of Palawan
  - Battle of the Visayas
    - Battle of Panay
    - Battle of Cebu City
    - Battle of Negros
  - Battle of Mindanao
    - Battle of Maguindanao
    - Battle of Davao
    - Battle of Bukidnon
  - Raid on Taipei
  - Action of 24 July 1945
- Borneo campaign
  - Battle of Tarakan
  - Action of 8 June 1945
  - Battle of North Borneo
    - Operation Agas
    - Operation Semut
    - Battle of Labuan
    - Battle of Beaufort
  - Battle of Balikpapan
- Japanese coup d'état of French Indochina (9 March 1945 – 15 May 1945)
- August Revolution (13 August 1945 – 28 August 1945)
  - Battle of Thái Nguyên (17 August 1945 – 25 August 1945)

=== Pacific Ocean ===
- Hawaiian Islands campaign
  - Attack on Pearl Harbor
  - First Bombardment of Midway
  - Shelling of Johnston and Palmyra
  - Operation K
  - Battle of Midway
- Battle of Wake Island
- New Guinea campaign
  - Battle of Rabaul
  - Invasion of Salamaua–Lae
  - Battle of the Coral Sea
  - Kokoda Track campaign
    - Invasion of Buna-Gona
    - Battle of Kokoda
    - Battle of Isurava
    - First Battle of Eora Creek–Templeton's Crossing
    - Battle of Mission Ridge–Brigade Hill
    - Battle of Ioribaiwa
    - Second Battle of Eora Creek–Templeton's Crossing
    - Battle of Oivi–Gorari
  - Battle of Milne Bay
  - Battle of Goodenough Island
  - Battle of Buna–Gona
  - Salamaua–Lae campaign
    - Battle of Wau
    - Battle of the Bismarck Sea
    - Battle of Mubo
    - Battle of Bobdubi
    - Battle of Lababia Ridge
    - Landing on Nassau Bay
    - Battle of Roosevelt Ridge
    - Battle of Mount Tambu
    - Landing on Nadzab
    - Landing on Lae
  - Operation Chronicle
  - Bombing of Wewak
  - Markham, Ramu, and Finisterre campaign
  - Huon Peninsula campaign
  - Bombing of Rabaul
  - New Britain campaign
    - Battle of Arawe
    - Battle of Cape Gloucester
    - Neutralisation of Rabaul
    - Battle of Talasea
    - Landing on Jacquitnot Bay
    - Battle of Wide Bay–Open Bay
  - Admiralty Islands campaign
  - Landing on Emirau
  - Take Ichi convoy
  - Western New Guinea campaign
    - Bombing of Hollandia
    - Battle of Hollandia
    - Landing on Aitape
    - Battle of Wakde
    - Battle of Biak
    - Battle of Lone Tree Hill
    - Battle of Noemfoor
    - Battle of Driniumor River
    - Battle of Sansapor
    - Battle of Morotai
  - Aitape-Wewak campaign
- Solomon Islands campaign
  - Operation SO and SE
  - Invasion of Tulagi
  - Guadalcanal campaign
    - Battle of Tulagi and Gavutu–Tanambogo
    - Battle of Savo Island
    - Battle of the Tenaru
    - Battle of the Eastern Solomons
    - Battle of Edson's Ridge
    - Second and Third Battles of the Matanikau
    - Battle of Cape Esperance
    - Battle of Henderson Field
    - Battle of the Santa Cruz Islands
    - Fourth Battle of the Matanikau
    - Koli Point action
    - Carlson's patrol
    - Naval Battle of Guadalcanal
    - Battle of Tassafaronga
    - Battle of Mount Austen, the Galloping Horse, and the Sea Horse
  - Operation Cleanslate
  - Battle of Blackett Strait
  - Operation Vengeance
  - New Georgia campaign
    - Battle of Wickham Anchorage
    - Battle of Viru Harbor
    - Landing on Rendova
    - Battle of Kula Gulf
    - Drive on Munda Point
    - Battle of Kolombangara
    - Battle of Enogai
    - Battle of Bairoko
    - Battle of Munda Point
    - Battle of Vella Gulf
    - Battle of Vella Lavella
    - Battle off Horaniu
    - Battle of Arundel Island
    - New Georgia counterattack
    - Naval Battle of Vella Lavella
  - Bougainville campaign
    - Battle of the Treasury Islands
    - Raid on Choiseul
    - Landing on Cape Torokina
    - Battle of Empress Augusta Bay
    - Battle of Koromokina Lagoon
    - Battle of Piva Trail
    - Battle of the Coconut Grove
    - Battle of Piva Forks
    - Battle of Cape St. George
    - Raid on Koiari
    - Battle of Hellzapoppin Ridge and Hill 600A
    - Battle of Pearl Ridge
    - Second Battle of Torokina
    - Battle of Tsimba Ridge
    - Battle of Slater's Knoll
    - Battle of the Hongorai River
    - Battle of Porton Plantation
    - Battle of Ratsua
  - Battle of the Green Islands
- Aleutian Islands campaign
  - Battle of Dutch Harbor
  - Japanese invasion of Kiska
  - Japanese invasion of Attu
  - Landing on Amchitka
  - Battle of the Komandorski Islands
  - Battle of Attu
  - Battle of the Pips
  - Operation Cottage
- Gilbert and Marshall Islands campaign
  - Raid on Makin Island
  - Battle of Tarawa
  - Battle of Makin
  - Battle of Kwajalein
  - Operation Hailstone
  - Battle of Eniwetok
- Mariana and Palau Islands campaign
  - Battle of Saipan
  - Battle of the Philippine Sea
  - Battle of Guam
  - Battle of Tinian
  - Battle of Peleliu
  - Battle of Angaur

== Command areas ==
The command structures of the Pacific War varied, reflecting the different roles of various belligerent nations, and often involving different geographic scopes. These included the following:

- American commands:
  - Pacific Ocean Areas
  - South West Pacific Area
- British and Allied commands:
  - GHQ India, commanding the British Army in India
  - Eastern Fleet
  - American-British-Dutch-Australian Command
  - South East Asia Command
  - Far East Command, the Soviet command during the war against Japan in 1945
- Japanese commands:
  - Japanese Combined Fleet, the Japanese command which oversaw naval operations
  - Southern Expeditionary Army Group, the Japanese army command in the South West Pacific and South East Asia
