= South West Pacific theatre of World War II =

Theatre of World War II

The South West Pacific Area, during World War II, was a major operational area of the war between the Allies and the Axis. It included the Philippines, the Dutch East Indies (except for Sumatra), Borneo, Australia, its mandate Territory of New Guinea (including the Bismarck Archipelago) and the Solomon Islands' western part. This area was defined by the Allied powers' South West Pacific Area (SWPA) command.

Japanese forces fought primarily against the United States and Australian forces in the South West Pacific Area. The Philippines, New Zealand, the Netherlands (in the Dutch East Indies), the United Kingdom, and other Allied nations also contributed forces.

The South Pacific became a major theatre of the war following the Japanese attack on Pearl Harbor in December 1941. Initially, US war plans called for a counteroffensive across the Central Pacific, but this was disrupted by the loss of battleships at Pearl Harbor. During the First South Pacific Campaign, US forces sought to establish a defensive perimeter against additional Japanese attacks. This was followed by the Second South Pacific Campaign, which began with the Battle of Guadalcanal.

== Commands ==
=== Allied ===
The U.S. General Douglas MacArthur had been in command of the American forces in the Philippines in what was to become the South West Pacific Area, but was then part of a larger theatre that encompassed the South West Pacific, the Southeast Asian mainland (including Indochina and Malaya) and the North of Australia, under the short lived American-British-Dutch-Australian Command (ABDACOM). Shortly after the collapse of ABDACOM, the supreme command of the South West Pacific Area passed to MacArthur, appointed Supreme Commander, South West Pacific Area, on 30 March 1942. However, MacArthur preferred to use the title "Commander-in-Chief." The forces remaining in South-East Asia under Japanese attack reverted to their local commanders, and were soon mostly destroyed or evacuated.

The other major theatre in the Pacific, Pacific Ocean Areas, was commanded by U.S. Admiral Chester Nimitz, who was also Commander-in-Chief Pacific Fleet. The US Joint Chiefs and the British-U.S. Combined Chiefs of Staff oversaw MacArthur and Nimitz. Captain Allan Rockwell McCann was appointed to represent the Navy as General MacArthur's Senior Representative of Commander, Submarines, Southwest Pacific.

=== Japanese ===
Most Japanese forces in the theatre were part of the Southern Expeditionary Army (南方軍, Nanpo gun), which was formed on November 6, 1941, under General Hisaichi Terauchi (also known as Count Terauchi). The Nanpo gun was responsible for Imperial Japanese Army (IJA) ground and air units in Southeast Asia and the South Pacific. The Combined Fleet (聯合艦隊, Rengō Kantai) of the Imperial Japanese Navy (IJN) was responsible for all Japanese warships, naval aviation units and marine infantry units. As the Japanese military did not formally utilize joint/combined staff at the operational level, the command structures/geographical areas of operations of the Nanpo gun and Rengō Kantai overlapped each other and those of the Allies.

== Campaigns and battles ==
- First Philippines campaign (8 December 1941 – 8 May 1942)
  - Attack on Clark Field
  - Battle of Batan Island
  - Battle of Aparri
  - Battle of Vigan
  - Battle of Lingayen Gulf
  - Battle of Bataan
  - Battle of Corregidor
  - Battle of Legazpi
  - Battle of Lamon Bay
  - Battle of Cebu
  - Battle of Panay
  - Battle of Davao
  - Battle of Digos
  - Battle of Zamboanga
  - Battle of Cotabato
  - Battle of Parang
  - Battle of Malabang
  - Battle of Cagayan de Oro
- Dutch East Indies campaign (1941–1942)
  - First Battle of Borneo
  - Battle of Manado
  - First Battle of Tarakan
  - First Battle of Balikpapan
  - Battle of Ambon (30 January – 3 February 1942)
  - Battle of Makassar Strait
  - Invasion of Sumatra
  - Battle of Palembang
  - Battle of Timor (19 February 1942 – 10 February 1943)
  - Battle of Badung Strait (19–20 February 1942)
  - Sinking of USS Langley
  - First Battle of the Java Sea (27 February 1942)
  - Battle of Sunda Strait (28 February – 1 March 1942)
  - Second Battle of the Java Sea (1 March 1942)
  - Battle of Java
- Bombing of Darwin (19 February 1942)
- New Guinea campaign (1942–1945)
  - Battle of Rabaul (January–February 1942)
  - Invasion of Salamaua–Lae (March 1942)
  - Battle of the Coral Sea (4–8 May 1942)
  - Kokoda Track campaign (July–November 1942)
    - Invasion of Buna-Gona (July 1942)
  - Battle of Milne Bay (August–September 1942)
  - Battle of Goodenough Island (October 1942)
  - Battle of Buna-Gona (November 1942 – January 1943)
  - Battle of Wau (January 1943)
  - Battle of the Bismarck Sea (2 March 1943)
  - Salamaua-Lae campaign (April–September 1943)
    - Landing at Nassau Bay (June 1943)
  - Operation Chronicle (June 1943)
  - Finisterre Range campaign (September 1943 – April 1944)
  - Huon Peninsula campaign (September 1943 – March 1944)
  - New Britain campaign (26 December 1943)
  - Admiralty Islands campaign (29 February 1944)
  - Western New Guinea campaign (22 April 1944 – 15 August 1945)
    - Invasion of Hollandia and Landing at Aitape (22 April 1944)
    - Battle of Wakde (18–21 May 1944)
    - Battle of Biak (27 May 1944)
    - Battle of Lone Tree Hill (17 May – 2 September 1944)
    - Battle of Noemfoor (2 July 1944)
    - Battle of Driniumor River (10 July – 25 August 1944)
    - Battle of Sansapor (30 July – 31 August 1944)
    - Battle of Morotai (15 September 1944)
    - Aitape-Wewak campaign (November 1944 – August 1945)
- Solomon Islands campaign (1942–1945)
  - Guadalcanal campaign (7 August 1942 – 9 February 1943)
    - Battle of Savo Island
    - Battle of Cape Esperance
    - Second Naval Battle of Guadalcanal
    - Battle of Tassafaronga
  - New Georgia Campaign (30 June – 7 October 1943)
    - Battle of Kula Gulf (6 July 1943)
    - Battle of Kolombangara (13 July 1943)
    - Battle of Vella Gulf (6–7 August 1943)
    - Naval Battle of Vella Lavella (6–7 October 1943)
  - Battle of the Treasury Islands (27 October – 12 November 1943)
  - Bougainville campaign (November 1943 – August 1945)
    - Battle of Empress Augusta Bay (2 November 1943)
    - Battle of Cape St. George (25 November 1943)
- Second Philippines campaign (20 October 1944 – 15 August 1945)
  - Convoy Hi-71
  - Shin'yō Maru incident
  - Formosa Air Battle
  - Battle of Leyte Gulf
  - Battle of Ormoc Bay
  - Convoy Hi-81
  - South China Sea raid
  - Penghu air raids
  - Raid on Taihoku
  - Action of 24 July 1945
  - Battle of the Visayas
  - Battle of Leyte
  - Battle of Panay
  - Battle of Simara
  - Battle of Negros
  - Battle of Cebu City
  - Battle of Mindoro
  - Battle of Lingayen Gulf
  - Battle of Luzon
  - Battle of Kirang Pass
  - Raid at Cabanatuan
  - Battle of Bataan
  - Battle of Manila
  - Battle of Corregidor
  - Battle of Baguio
  - Battle of Villa Verde Trail
  - Raid on Los Baños
  - Battle of Wawa Dam
  - Battle of Bacsil Ridge
  - Battle of Bessang Pass
  - Battle of Mayoyao Ridge
  - Battle of Palawan
  - Battle of Mindanao
  - Battle of Bukidnon
  - Battle of Maguindanao
  - Battle of Davao
- Borneo campaign (1945)
  - Second Battle of Tarakan (May–June 1945)
  - Action of 8 June 1945
  - Battle of North Borneo (June–August 1945)
  - Second Battle of Balikpapan (July 1945)

== Gallery ==
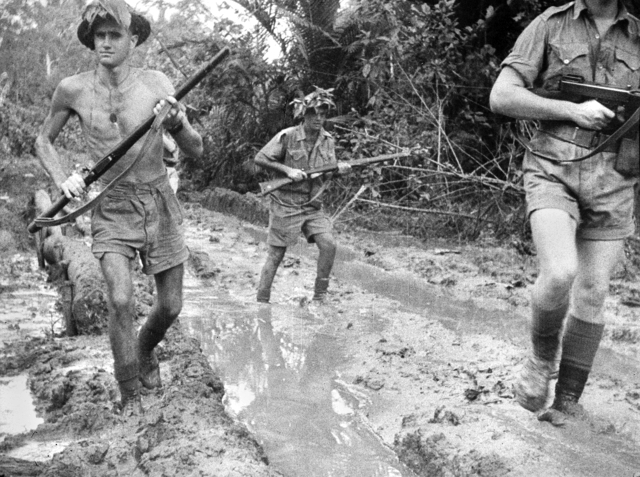
Australian troops at Milne Bay, New Guinea. The Australian army was the first to inflict defeat on the Imperial Japanese Army during World War II at the Battle of Milne Bay in August–September 1942.

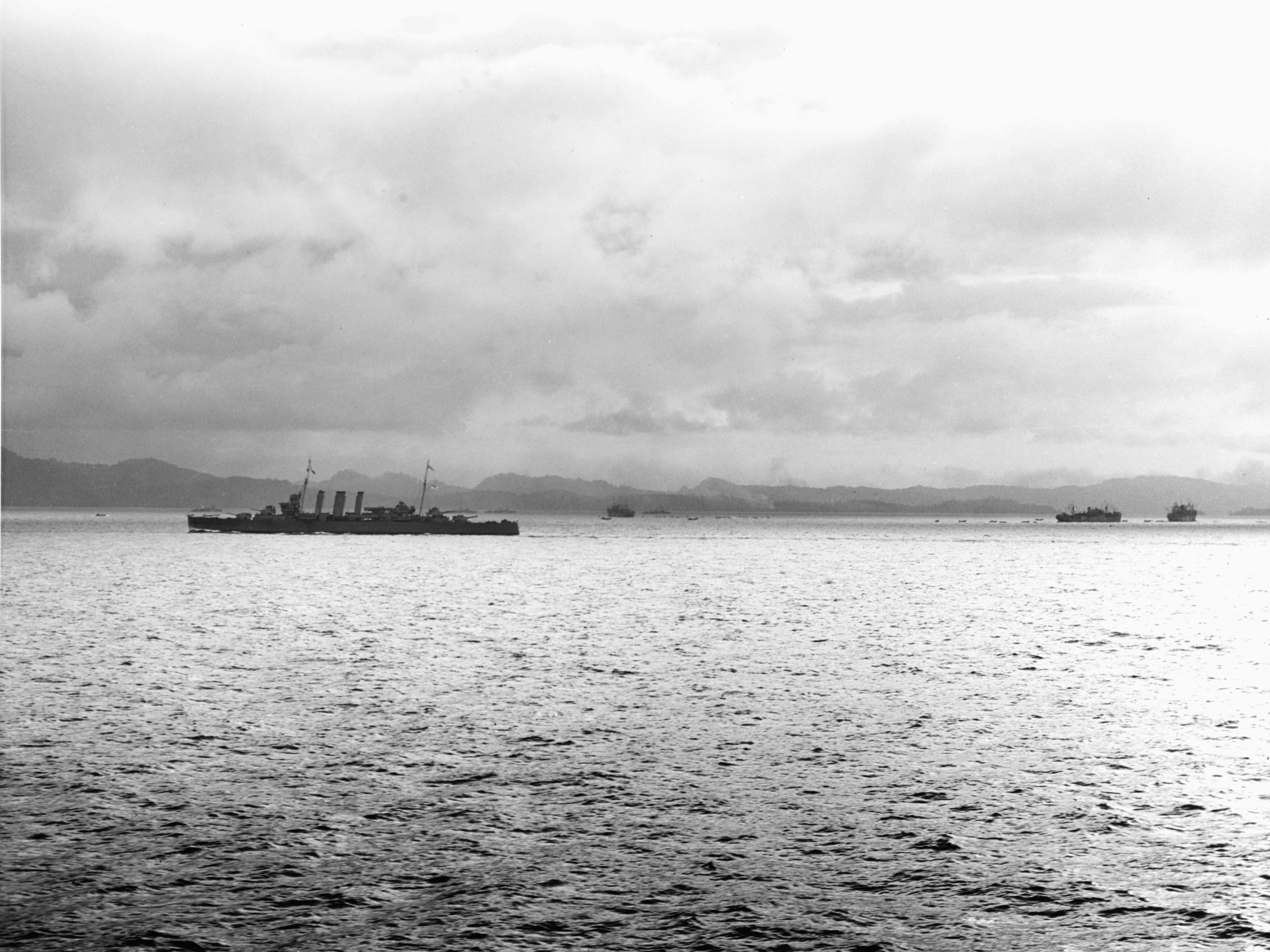
Australian cruiser Canberra (center left) protects three Allied transport ships (background and center right) unloading troops and supplies at Tulagi.

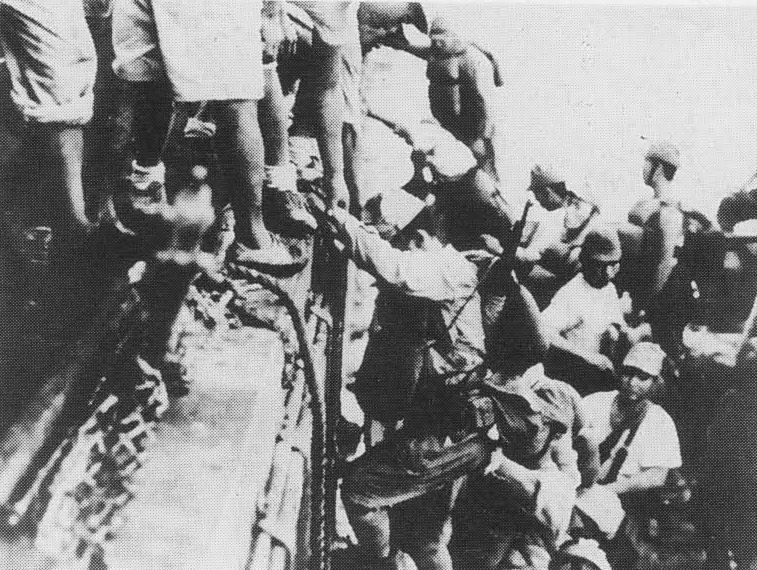
Japanese troops load onto a warship in preparation for a Tokyo Express run sometime in 1942.

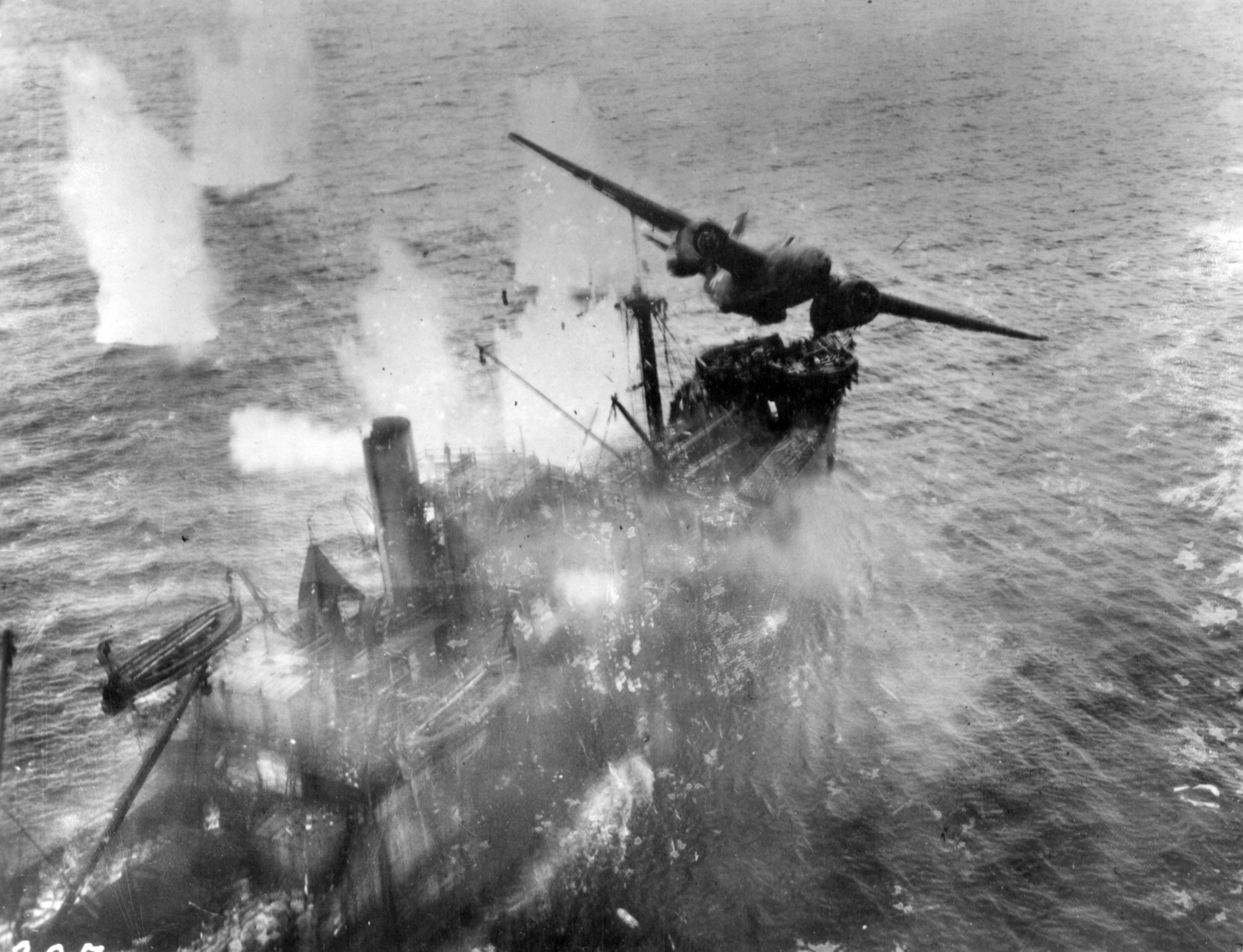
A U.S. A-20G bomber of the 3rd Attack Group bombs a Japanese merchant ship off New Guinea during the Battle of the Bismarck Sea, March 1943.

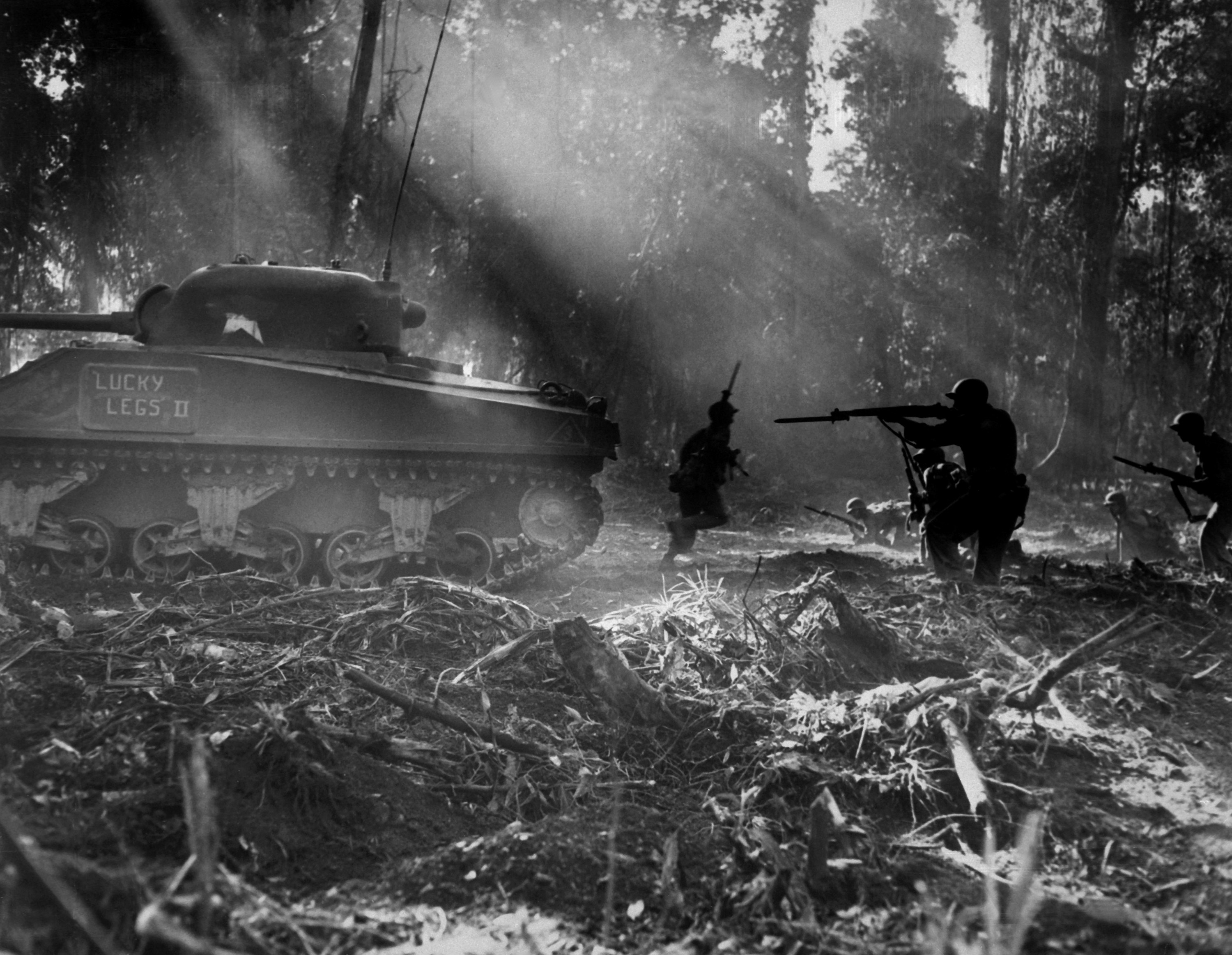
U.S. Army soldiers advancing behind an M4 Sherman tank on Bougainville, March 1944.

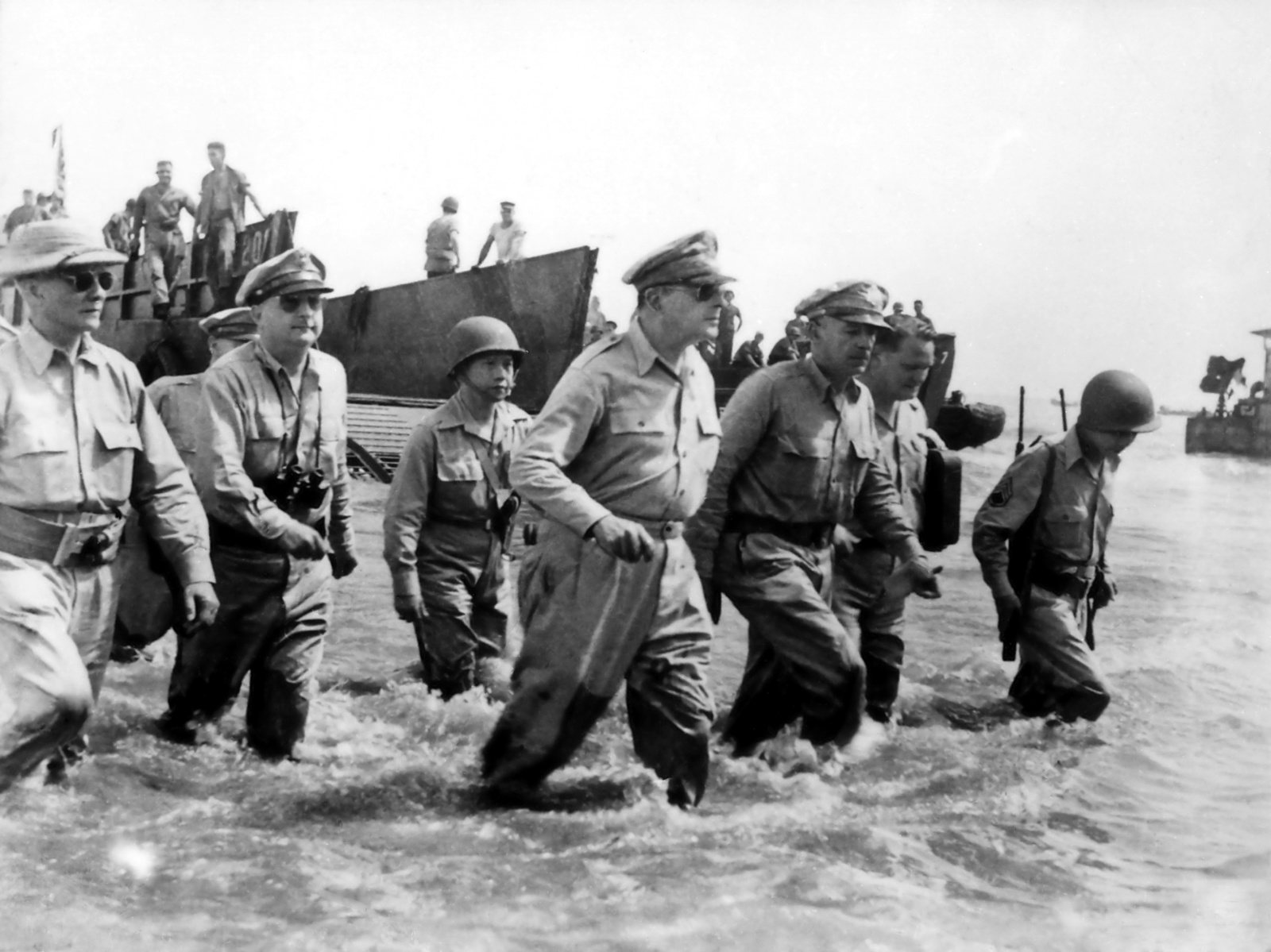
Gen. Douglas MacArthur wades ashore during initial landings at Leyte, Philippine Islands, 20 October 1944.

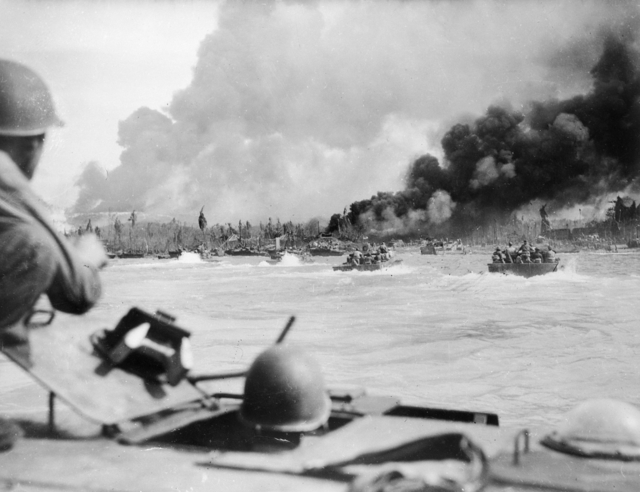
U.S.-manned Alligators transport Australian troops during the Battle of Balikpapan, Borneo, 1 July 1945.

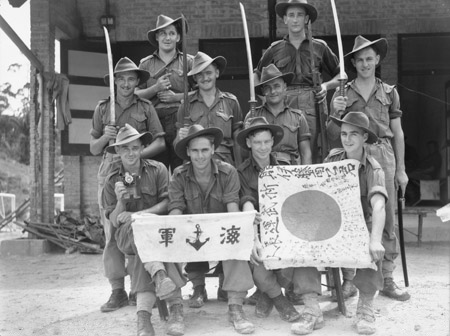
Australian soldiers of the 2/24th Battalion pose with captured Japanese swords and flags in July 1945.
