= Bombing of Toyohashi =

WWII Allied air raid on Toyohashi, Japan

- Part of air raids on Japan, Pacific War
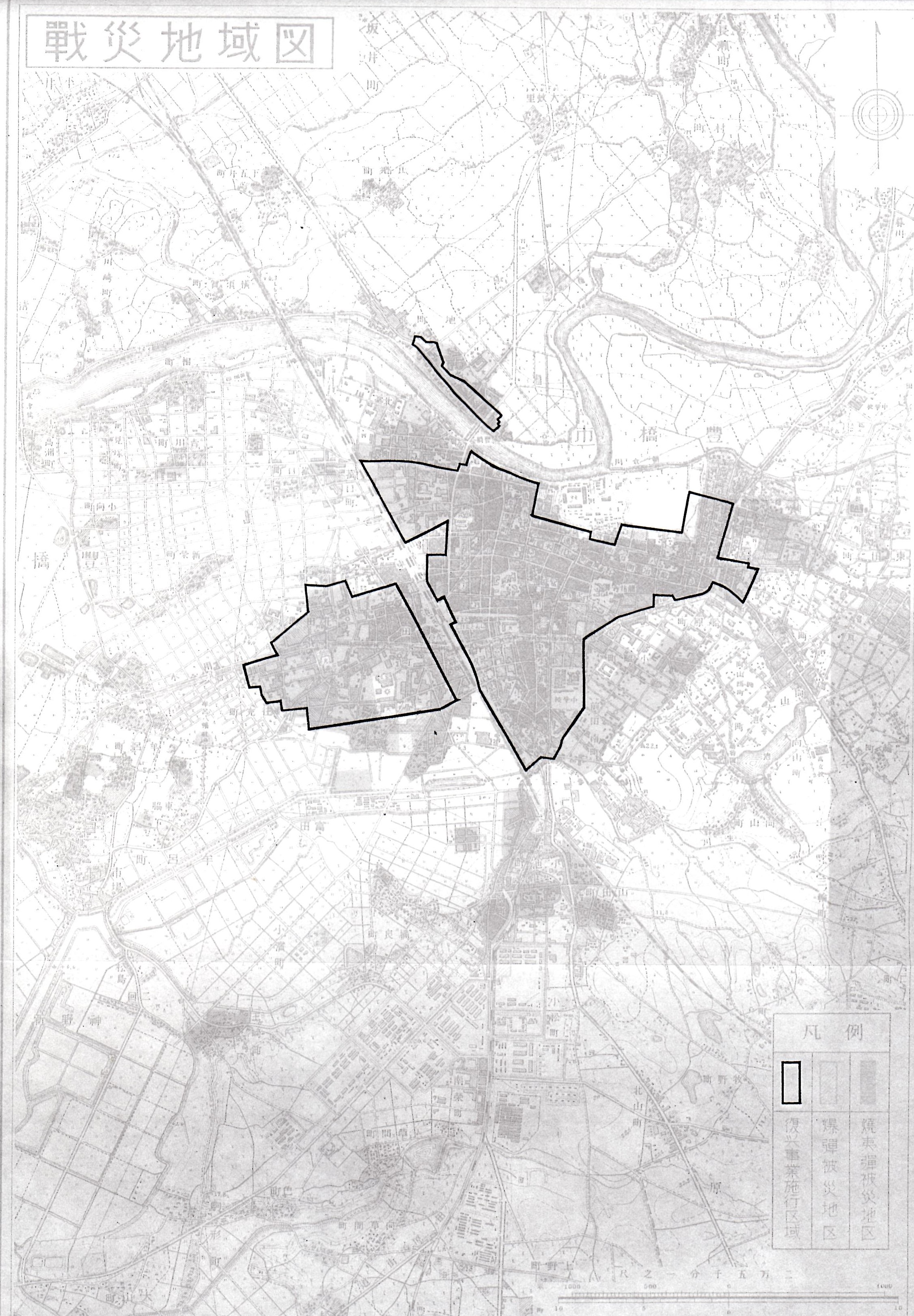
- Map of the scope of the Toyohashi air raid in June 1945
Date	19–20 June 1945
Location	Toyohashi, Japan 34.766°N 137.383°E

Belligerents
United States	Japan

Casualties and losses
- 624 dead 346 injured

The bombing of Toyohashi (豊橋空襲, Toyohashi kūshū) was a strategic bombing operation on the night of 19 June 1945 against the city of Toyohashi, Japan. The air raid was part of the Allies' air raids on Japan during the Pacific War.

== Background ==
During the Pacific War, as now, the city of Toyohashi, Aichi was an important hub in the transportation network of central Japan. Toyohashi Station is located along the Tōkaidō Main Line linking Tokyo and Osaka, and also serves as the origin of the Iida and Atsumi Lines which facilitate access to rural areas of eastern Aichi Prefecture. The city had a fairly small industrial base at the time, but it was more important for its port facilities on Mikawa Bay. In addition to these strategic civilian targets, Toyohashi hosted a number of military targets, such as a large training area for Imperial Japanese Army recruits located near Aichi University, and the headquarters of several army units, including the 18th Infantry Regiment, the 4th Cavalry Brigade, and the 4th Independent Combat Engineer Regiment. Toyohashi also had an airfield that served the 381st Naval Air Group which flew Mitsubishi J2M Raiden interceptors.

== Air raid ==
There were nine air raids on Toyohashi between January and June 1945. About 25-30 people were killed in the first eight. These early air raids are barely mentioned in relevant historical texts and were probably the result of Allied bombers hitting Toyohashi as an alternate target or a target of opportunity. Only the ninth raid, by far the largest, became known as "The Toyohashi Air Raid". Starting late on the night of 19 June or after midnight, in the early hours of 20 June 1945, 136 Boeing B-29 Superfortresses conducted a firebombing operation on the city of Toyohashi. The air raid lasted for about three hours, and ended a little before dawn. The areas primarily affected included a large part of the downtown area between Toyohashi Station and City Hall, large sections of the Azumada and Maebata neighborhoods, and neighborhoods around Azumada Elementary School.

On the same night as the Toyohashi Air Raid, two other firebombing operations were being conducted elsewhere in Japan. One was in neighboring Shizuoka prefecture, and would become known as the Great Shizuoka Air Raid (静岡大空襲 Shizuoka dai-kūshū). The other was the Great Fukuoka Air Raid (福岡大空襲 Fukuoka dai-kūshū) on the island of Kyushu.

== Results ==
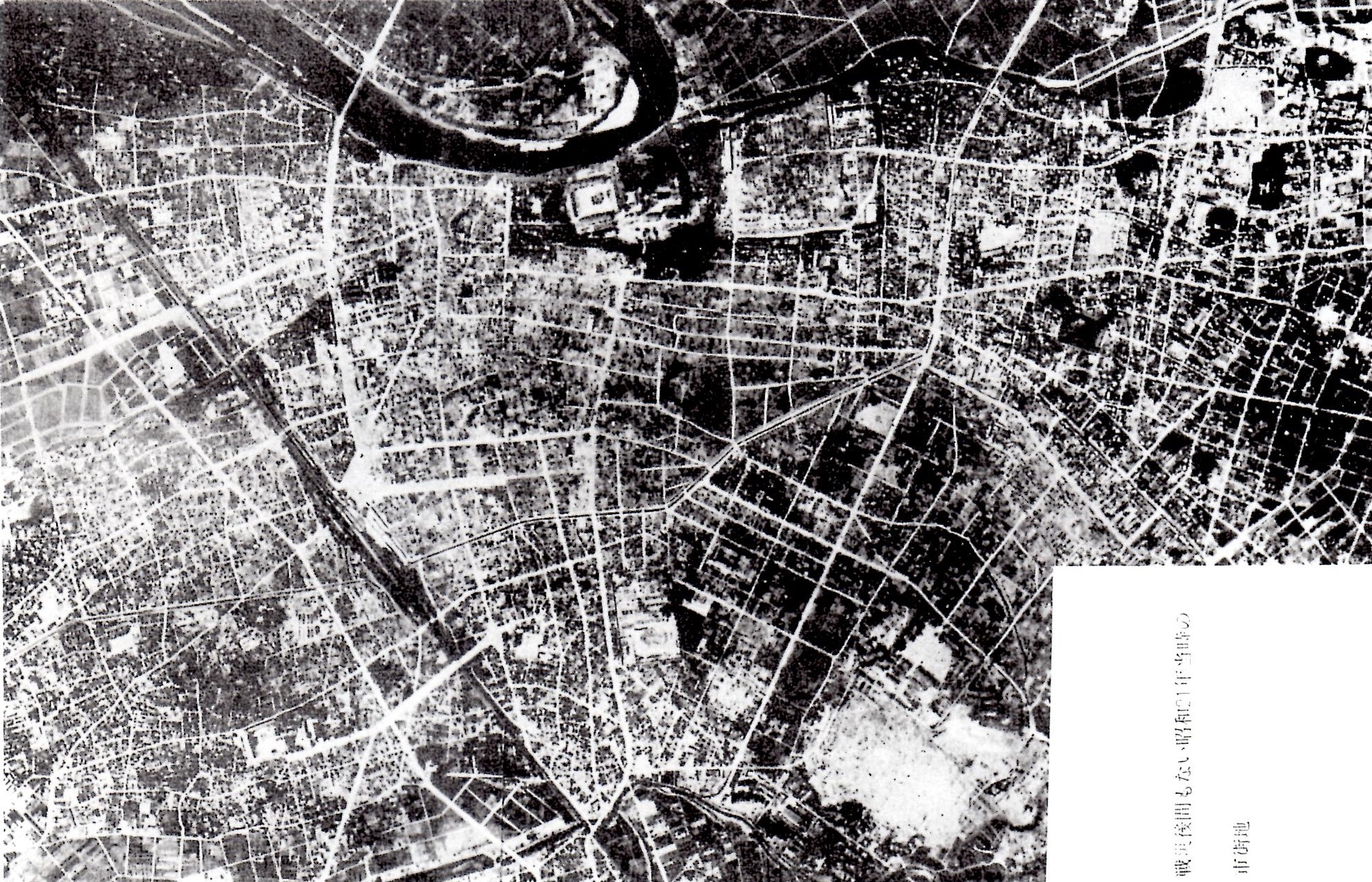
Toyohashi city aerial photograph in 1946

In the aftermath of the Toyohashi Air Raid, Japanese authorities compiled the following data on the damage done on the night of 19–20 June 1945:

- 624 dead
- 346 injured
- 16,009 households affected
- 68,502 people affected
- 15,886 houses damaged

Among the buildings that were destroyed were five temples, Azumada Elementary School, and the Kawai Hospital (which was rebuilt, though it has changed ownership and location several times, and is now the Oshima Orthopedic Clinic in the Ihara neighborhood). In 1946, the United States Army Air Forces estimated that 61.9% of the city had been destroyed.

While property damage in Toyohashi was high, casualties were relatively light. This was due in part to lessons learned from the several air raids on neighboring Hamamatsu city, which had suffered much more since its first air raid in February 1945.

== See also ==
- Air raids on Japan
- Japan campaign

== Bibliography ==
- Aichi University Editorial Committee (2006). 愛知大学小史 - 60 年の歩み (Short History of Aichi University: Sixty Years of Progress). Azusa Publisher.
- Bradley, F.J. (1999). No Strategic Targets Left. Paducah, Kentucky: Turner Publishing. ISBN 1-56311-483-6.
- Caidin, Martin (1960). A Torch to the Enemy: The Fire Raid on Tokyo. Bantam War Books. ISBN 0-553-29926-3.
- Hoyt, Edwin P. (2000). Inferno: The Fire Bombing of Japan, March 9 – August 15, 1945. Madison Books. ISBN 1-56833-149-5.
- Isomura, Ryuki (2000). Record of Personal Accounts of the Toyohashi Air Raid [豊橋空襲体験記]. Mikawa Citizens' Life Cooperative Association.
- 大島整形外科が新築開院 [Oshima Orthopedics Opens in a Newly Constructed Clinic]. Tonichi Shinbun 東日新聞 (in Japanese). Toyohashi, Japan. 27 January 2006. Archived from the original on 6 October 2011.
- 豊橋市史 史料目録 四 [Toyohashi City History: Historical Catalogue] (in Japanese). Vol. 4. Toyohashi, Japan: Toyohashi City Hall. 1972.
- United States Strategic Bombing Survey. Summary Report(Pacific War) July 1, 1946.
