= Gilbert and Marshall Islands campaign =

United States military campaign during World War II

- Part of the Pacific War and World War II
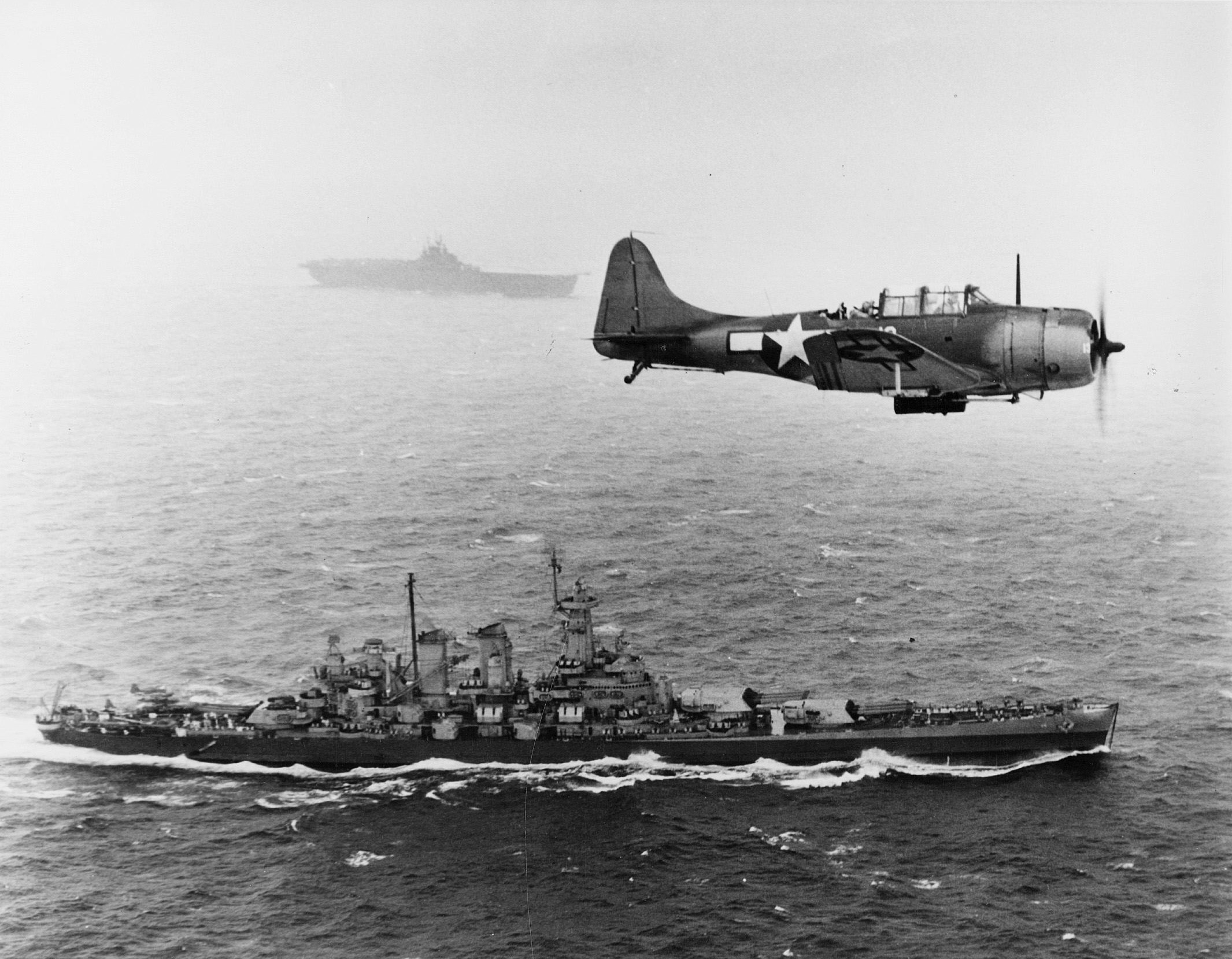
- An SBD Dauntless flies patrol over USS Washington and USS Lexington during the Gilbert and Marshall islands campaign
Date	August 1942 – February 1944
Location	Gilbert and Marshall Islands
Result	Allied victory

Belligerents
United States; Gilbert and Ellice Islands	Japan

Commanders and leaders
United States Navy: Chester W. Nimitz; Raymond A. Spruance; Richmond K. Turner; Marc Mitscher; Harry W. Hill; Carl Henry Jones; United States Marine Corps: Holland M. Smith; Thomas E. Watson; United States Army: Ralph C. Smith	Imperial Japanese Navy: Kōsō Abe; Keiji Shibazaki †; Monzo Akiyama †; Chūichi Hara; Imperial Japanese Army: Yoshimi Nishida †

Casualties and losses
~5,100 killed or missing; 6,700 wounded	~21,000 killed; 375 captured

The Gilbert and Marshall Islands campaign was a series of engagements fought from August 1942 to February 1944, in the Pacific theatre of World War II between the United States and Japan. They were the first battles of a large-scale offensive across the Central Pacific by the United States Pacific Fleet and Marine Corps. The goal of the campaign was to establish airfields and naval bases that would allow American air and naval assets to support future operations across the Central Pacific. Operation Galvanic and Operation Kourbash were the codenames for the Gilberts campaign (in modern Kiribati), and included the seizures of Tarawa and Makin, which took place during the Battle of Tarawa on 20–23 November 1943 and the Battle of Makin on 20–24 November 1943. Operation Flintlock and Operation Catchpole had the goal of capturing Japanese bases at Kwajalein, Eniwetok, and Majuro in the Marshall Islands.

== Background ==
The Imperial Japanese Navy occupied the Gilbert Islands three days after the attack on Pearl Harbor. The Japanese built a seaplane base on Makin and dispersed troops along the coastlines of the northern atolls to monitor the Allied forces' movement in the South Pacific. The Marshall Islands are located approximately 220 miles (350 km) northwest of the Gilbert Islands, and had been occupied by the Japanese since World War I as part of the South Seas Mandate. The Japanese regarded the islands as an important outpost for their navy.

Allied commanders believed that an eventual surrender of Japan would require the capture of these islands. While General Douglas MacArthur, commander of the United States Army in the south Pacific, wanted to push towards the Philippines via New Guinea, United States Navy Admiral Chester W. Nimitz favored a drive across the Central Pacific, leapfrogging through the Gilberts, the Marshalls, the Carolines, and the Marianas. This would place American B-29 bombers within range of Tokyo. In addition to forcing the Japanese to fight two fronts against the Allies (Nimitz driving from the east and MacArthur from the south), Nimitz's plan would neutralize important outlying Japanese defenses and provide bases American forces to conduct future attacks against Japanese-occupied islands. The plan called for the seizure of Tarawa and Makin in the Gilbert Islands, and Majuro, Kwajalein, and Eniwetok in the Marshalls.

== Gilberts ==
=== Prelude ===
Japanese forces occupied the Gilbert Islands on 9-10 December 1941, landing troops of the South Seas Detachment on Tarawa and Makin Islands (now Butaritari and Makin), a few days after the attack on Pearl Harbor. These forces were tasked with protecting the southeastern Japanese flank from Allied counterattacks, and with isolating Australia. The islands were designated as a staging point for the planned invasion of the Ellice Islands during Operation FS, but the Japanese setback at the Coral Sea delayed these plans, and their defeats at Midway and later in the Guadalcanal campaign put a definitive end to an offensive utilization of the islands by the Japanese.

Following Carlson's Raiders' diversionary raid on Makin Island and the defeat at Guadalcanal, the Japanese command had grown aware of the vulnerability and strategic significance of the Gilbert Islands, and started adopting a defensive stance. Because Japanese planners wanted to heavily fortify the Marianas and Palau before the Americans could arrive there in force, garrison commanders in the outer islands were told to hold out as long as possible with minimal support. Fortifications were quickly improved by the Japanese beginning in March 1943. Makin Atoll had a seaplane base built on the main island of Butaritari, while Tarawa housed barely enough room for an airfield on its main harbor island, Betio.

=== Battle of Tarawa ===
American forces seized Tarawa from nearly 5,000 Imperial Japanese Naval Landing Forces (3,000 Special Naval Landing Forces and 1,247 construction laborers) from 20-23 November 1943. The Makin Islands, in contrast, were only held by a total of 798 Japanese troops, including some 100 isolated Japanese aviation personnel. A detachment of 300 soldiers from Tarawa also occupied the island of Abemama in September 1942, but by the time American troops landed there in November 1943, most Japanese soldiers had been evacuated back to Tarawa, leaving only 25 Special Naval Landing Forces behind to defend the island.

Lieutenant Junior Grade Seizo Ishikawa, the Japanese commander in charge of defending Makin, ordered his troops to build extensive fortifications on the island. These included several 8 in (203 mm) coastal defense guns, 1.5 in (38 mm) anti-tank gun positions, machine gun emplacements, rifle pits, and 15-foot (4.6 m) deep tank barriers with anti-tank guns and barbed wire. These were ostensibly designed to hold the island until reinforcements could arrive.

On Tarawa, Keiji Shibazaki had 4,836 troops, including around 2,600 Special Naval Landing Forces, 1,000 Japanese construction workers and 1,200 Korean laborers. He intended to primarily defend Betio, the largest island in the atoll and the site of a crucial Japanese airfield. Shibazaki had 14 coastal defense guns, 50 pieces of field artillery at his dispoal, and oversaw the construction of over 100 machine gun nests, 500 pillboxes, and a large wall across the northern lagoon.

Despite heavy casualties, the U.S. Marines took Tarawa after 3 days of fighting. Many officers questioned the significance of the invasion and accompanying heavy loss of American lives.

== Marshalls ==
=== Prelude ===
U.S. newsreel about the invasion

After the Gilbert Islands fell to the Americans in late November 1943, Admiral Mineichi Koga of the Japanese Combined Fleet was unsure of which islands the Americans would strike next. Without any carrier aircraft to provide reconnaissance, he ordered Admiral Masami Kobayashi to disperse his 28,000 troops primarily to the outer islands of Maloelap, Wotje, Jaliuit, and Mili. However, Allied intelligence intercepted and decrypted the Japanese transmissions, informing the Americans which islands were more heavily defended. The Americans therefore decided to invade the lesser-protected but strategically important islands of Majuro, Kwajalein, and Eniwetok.

As early as November 1943, B-24 bombers from the Seventh Air Force stationed in the Ellice Islands had flown bombing missions over Mili and Maloelap. On 3 December 1943, Task Force 50, under Rear Admiral Charles Alan Pownall, including fleet carriers USS Essex, Intrepid, Lexington, and Yorktown and light carriers Belleau Wood and Cowpens, launched airstrikes against Kwajalein. Four transports were sunk and fifty Japanese aircraft were destroyed, but the attack lacked strategic value. Fearing a counterattack from Wotje, Pownall ordered a second strike against the island. The Japanese counterattacked in a night bombing raid, in which Lexington sustained a torpedo hit but was not sunk. The American task force later returned to Pearl Harbor. The Yorktown's aircraft would continue to fly air cover over the atoll on 29 January, 31 January, and from 1 to 3 February.

The invasion of the Marshalls was delayed for about a month due to logistical problems. Japanese commander Rear Admiral Monzo Akiyama was aware that he lacked sufficient fortifications. He commanded a garrison of 8,000 men, but only about half of them were soldiers; most of the rest were Korean laborers. To defend Kwajalein, Akiyama was relying on an aerial counterstrike with his 110 aircraft to weaken the American landing forces. However, on 29 January 1944, American carrier aircraft from carriers Yorktown, Lexington, and Cowpens destroyed 92 Japanese fighters and bombers on the island. Akiyama now lacked the ability to effectively mount a successful defense of the island.

=== Battle of Majuro ===
On 31 January 1944, Rear Admiral Harry W. Hill dispatched the Reconnaissance Company from the V Amphibious Corps of the U.S. Marines and the U.S. Army's 2nd Battalion, 106th Infantry, 27th Infantry Division to land on Majuro. This marked the beginning of Operation Flintlock, the invasion of Kwajalein. American planners viewed the island as an important base for conducting air operations against the rest of the Marshall Islands, and eventually the Marianas. The force took the lightly defended island in a single day without any casualties.

=== Battle of Kwajalein ===
The same day as the landings on Majuro, the 4th Marine Division under Major General Harry Schmidt began their assault on Kwajalein. The Marines first landed on Roi-Namur, a group of islands in the northern part of the atoll. Significant confusion and delays were caused by poor weather and inexperienced Marines, but the pre-invasion naval and air bombardment was extremely effective. Out of roughly 3,000 Japanese soldiers, only about 300 were left to contest the American landings.

On the southern island of Kwajalein, Major General Charles H. Corlett's 7th Infantry Division landed with relative ease. Although Japanese defensive fortifications and counterattacks slowed the Americans, more troops, more experience in amphibious landings, an effective pre-landing bombardment, and the position of Japanese defenses on the opposite side of the atoll from where the Americans landed contributed to the capture of Kwajalein and its surrounding islands on 7 February. Of the entire force of about 8,000 Japanese troops guarding Majuro and Kwajalein, only 253 were taken prisoner. The Americans suffered 348 men killed, 1,462 wounded, and 183 missing in the eight days it took to take the atoll.

=== Battle of Eniwetok ===
American strategists believed that Eniwetok's islets contained enough room for airfields deemed critical for the upcoming invasion of the Marianas. Japanese Major General Yoshimi Nishida knew that it would be difficult to hold the main island of Eniwetok against invasion. He had roughly 4,000 troops, half of them IJA troops, the remainder a variety of sailors. Since the Americans would be landing with naval and air support, therefore giving them the upper hand once they established a beachhead, he decided to attempt to stop them at the beaches.

On 17 February 1944 the American naval bombardment of Eniwetok Atoll began, marking the beginning of Operation Catchpole. The same day, the 22nd Marine Regiment under Colonel John T. Walker landed on the northern island of Engebi. The landings were logistically difficult, with American men and materiel scattered along the beach. The Marines took the island on 18 February with 85 dead and 166 wounded. On 19 February, the 106th Infantry Regiment, under Lieutenant General Thomas E. Watson, landed on the main island of Eniwetok after a heavy bombardment. However, the Japanese spider holes and bunkers withstood much American shore bombardment. Landing American troops also faced the same logistical problems as the 22nd Marine Regiment on Engebi. Japanese forces concentrated in the southwest corner of the island counterattacked the American flank, forcing the Americans to attack mainly at night. Eniwetok Island was captured on 21 February with the loss of 37 Americans and nearly 800 Japanese.

On Parry Island, the Americans used heavy gunfire support from battleships before the 22nd Marine Regiment, under Watson, came ashore on 22 February, capturing the entire atoll by 23 February. On Eniwetok, 313 Americans were killed in the fighting, 879 were wounded, and 77 were reported missing, while the Japanese suffered 3,380 dead and 105 captured. This marked an end to the Marshall Islands campaign.

== Aftermath ==
The Americans emerged victorious in the Gilbert Islands campaign but suffered from logistical and experiential mishaps, ultimately incurring a total of 2,459 dead and 2,286 wounded. Meanwhile, Japanese forces suffered a total of 5,085 dead and 247 captured. The heavy casualties and gruesome fighting conditions for both sides convinced General Holland Smith, commanding general of V Amphibious Corps, that Tarawa should have been bypassed, although other high-ranking American officers disagreed.

By contrast, the Marshall Islands fell to American forces with relative ease. The Americans used lessons learned at Tarawa by ensuring that they outnumbered enemy defenders by nearly 6 to 1, and brought heavier firepower to bear (including use of armor-piercing shells), even after the islands had received nearly a month of heavy air and naval bombardment. In the Marshalls, the Americans had 611 killed, 2,341 wounded, and 260 missing, while the Japanese lost over 11,000 men and had 358 captured.

After the Gilbert and Marshall Islands were taken, the Allies built naval bases, fortifications, and airfields on the islands to prepare for an assault on the Marianas. The Japanese defeat forced the IJA and IJN to draw back to a new defensive perimeter, the Absolute National Defense Zone, which included the Marianas and Palau. Japanese forces heavily fortified these islands against the impending American assault, because if captured, they would allow American heavy bombers to directly target the Japanese home islands.

== See also ==
- Marshalls–Gilberts raids
- Raid on Truk Lagoon
