= Bombing of Aomori in World War II =

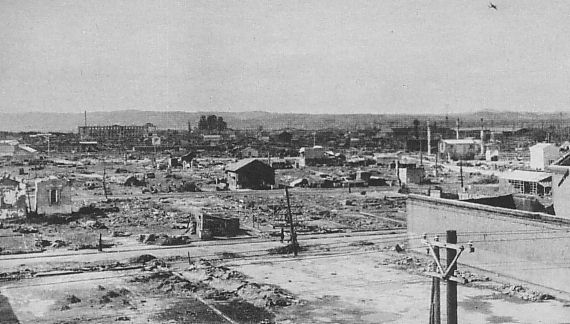
Aomori after the 1945 air raid

The bombing of Aomori (青森大空襲, Aomori dai-kūshū) on July 28, 1945, was part of the strategic bombing air raids on Japan waged by the United States against military and civilian targets and population centers during the Japan home islands campaign in the closing stages of the Pacific War.

== Background ==
Although the city of Aomori lacked major targets of military significance and was a minor city in terms of population, it was a prefectural capital and a major regional transportation hub. Aomori Station was the northern terminus for the Tōhoku Main Line and Ōu Main Line railways, and Aomori Port was the primary base for the Seikan Ferry connecting Honshu with Hokkaidō. In terms of military industry, the city had a factory owned by Toyo Seikan, which manufactured wings and landing gear for aircraft.

== Air raids ==
On the night of July 27, 1945, two Boeing B-29 Superfortresses dropped flares and a total of 60,000 leaflets on the city of Aomori. The leaflets, depicting a bomber dropping bombs, listed 11 cities (including Aomori), and stated that at least 5-6 of these cities would soon be destroyed, and urged the civilian population to leave. As in other cities, the Japanese government decreed that citizens must turn such leaflets over to the police without reading the contents on pain of 3 months imprisonment or a fine of 10 Yen. Discussion of the contents could result in indefinite imprisonment, and the restrictions were to be enforced by the kempeitai and local tonarigumi.

On the night of July 28–29, 1945, 63 B-29 bombers from the USAAF 58th Bombardment Wing departed from Iwo Jima, with their flight routing via Sendai and the Oga Peninsula, approaching Aomori via Ajigasawa village. One aircraft was forced back, but the remaining 63 arrived over Aomori at 22:10 and commenced a firebombing attack with E-48 500 lbs incendiary bombs on the central part of the city from an altitude of 5000 feet, lasting until 23:10. The bombers released a total of 83,000 new M74 incendiary devices on the largely wooden city. The resultant firestorm destroyed most of the city.

The estimated civilian casualties in the July 29 raid was an estimated 1,767 killed and 18,045 homes destroyed. Efforts by citizens and civil defense authorities to extinguish the napalm-filled M74 bomblets using traditional water bucket brigades and fire trucks contributed to the casualties and extent of damage. A year after the war, the United States Army Air Forces's Strategic Bombing Survey (Pacific War) reported that 88 percent of the city had been totally destroyed. However, the Toyo Seikan factory was undamaged.

The B-29 bombers continued on Tinian in the Mariana Islands without damage or loss.

== See also ==
- Air raids on Japan
- Evacuations of civilians in Japan during World War II
