= Bombing of Yokkaichi in World War II =

The bombing of Yokkaichi (四日市空襲, Yokkaichi kūshū) on June 18, 1945, was part of the strategic bombing campaign waged by the United States against military and civilian targets and population centers during the Japan home islands campaign in the closing stages of the Pacific War in 1945.

== Background ==
Although the city of Yokkaichi was not a major regional industrial and commercial center when compared with nearby Nagoya, it had port facilities of military significance, as well as a major oil refinery complex operated by the Imperial Japanese Navy. The Kansai Main Line railway connecting Nagoya with Osaka also ran through the city.

== Air raids ==
Yokkaichi was bombed a total of nine times during the war. The first air raid, on 0045 hours on 18 June 1945 was the most severe. A total of 89 B-29 Superfortress bombers of the United States Army Air Force's 313th Bombardment Wing targeted the center of the city, rather than its military and industrial zones on the outskirts, with a major firebombing attack. A total of 11,272 incendiary bombs were dropped (567.3 tons), killing 736 civilians, wounding 1,500 others, with 63 persons missing and 47,153 people left homeless. A year after the war, the US Army Air Force's Strategic Bombing Survey (Pacific War) reported that 35 percent of the city had been destroyed.

Yokkaichi was attacked again in 1945, on 22 June, 26 June, 9 July, 24 July, 28 July, 30 July, 2 August and 8 August. During these later attacks, the factories and oil refineries were destroyed. During one of these final attacks, conventional bombs with the same aerodynamics as the Nagasaki nuclear bomb were dropped as part of a rehearsal for the atomic bombing of Japan.

== See also ==
- Evacuations of civilians in Japan during World War II
- Grave of the Fireflies (short story), a semi-autobiographical short story set during the bombing

== General references ==
- Werrell, Kenneth P (1996). Blankets of Fire. Washington and London: Smithsonian Institution Press. ISBN 1-56098-665-4.
- Bradley, F. J. (1999). No Strategic Targets Left. Contribution of Major Fire Raids Toward Ending WWII. Turner Publishing. ISBN 1-56311-483-6.
- Carter, Kit C (1975). The Army Air Forces in World War II: Combat Chronology, 1941-1945. DIANE Publishing. ISBN 1-4289-1543-5.
- Crane, Conrad C. (1994). The Cigar that brought the Fire Wind: Curtis LeMay and the Strategic Bombing of Japan. JGSDF-U.S. Army Military History Exchange. ASIN B0006PGEIQ.
- Frank, Richard B. (2001). Downfall: The End of the Imperial Japanese Empire. Penguin. ISBN 0-14-100146-1.
- Grayling, A. C. (2007). Among the Dead Cities: The History and Moral Legacy of the WWII Bombing of Civilians in Germany and Japan. New York: Walker Publishing Company Inc. ISBN 978-0-8027-1565-4.
- Hoyt, Edwin P. (2000). Inferno: The Fire Bombing of Japan, March 9 – August 15, 1945. Madison Books. ISBN 1-56833-149-5.
- Shannon, Donald H. (1976). United States air strategy and doctrine as employed in the strategic bombing of Japan. U.S. Air University, Air War College. ASIN B0006WCQ86.
- Wainstock, Dennis (1996). The Decision to Drop the Atomic Bomb. Greenwood Publishing Group. ISBN 0-275-95475-7.
