= Bombing of Okazaki in World War II =

Air-raid in Japan by US forces during World War 2

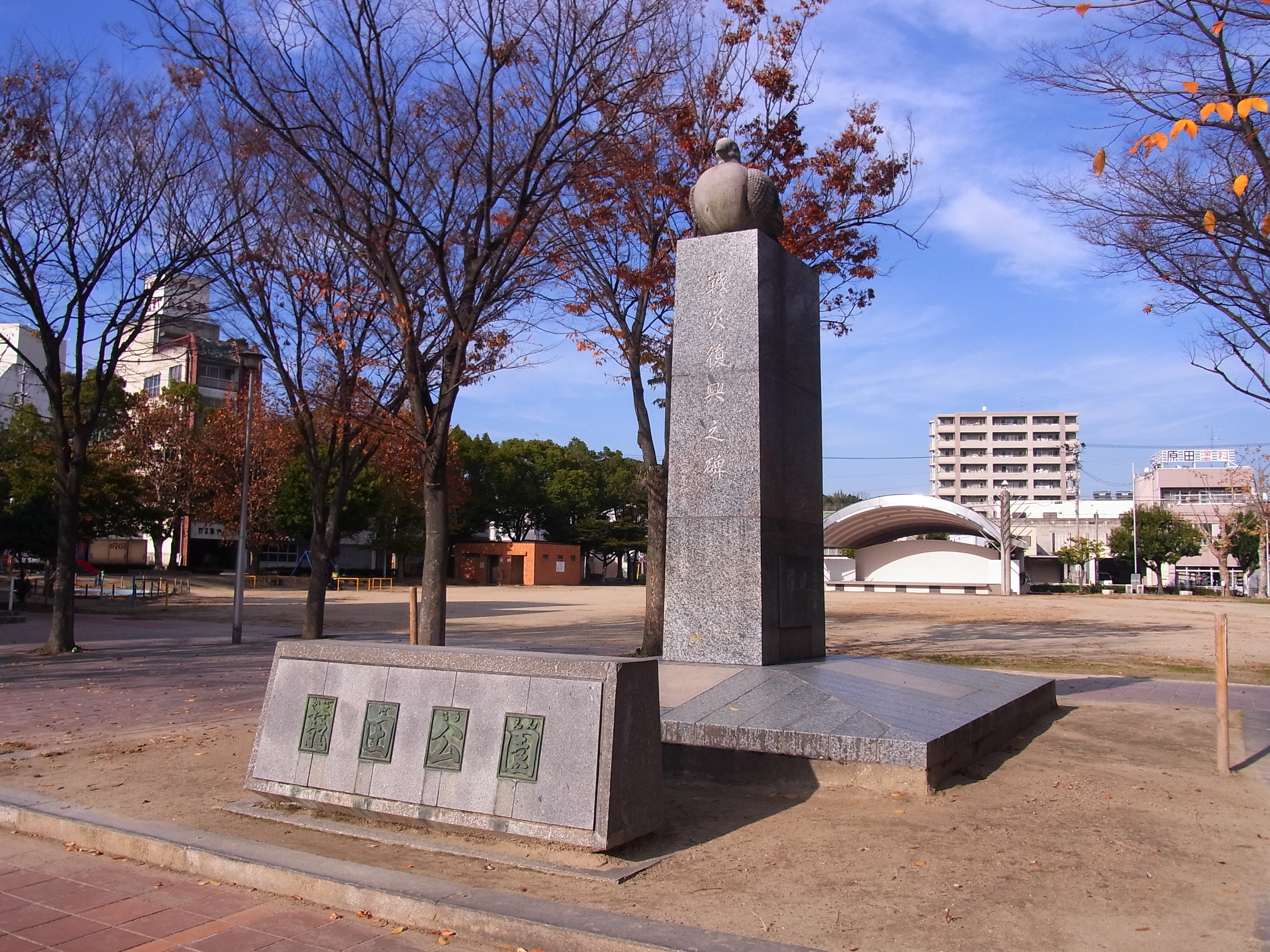
Memorial to the victims of the Okazaki Air Raid of 1945

The bombing of Okazaki (岡崎空襲, Okazaki kūshū) was part of the strategic bombing air raids on Japan campaign waged by the United States against military and civilian targets and population centers during the Japan home islands campaign in the closing stages of the Pacific War.

== Background ==
Although the city of Okazaki was not a major population center and had no major targets of military significance, it was a satellite town supporting the metropolis of Nagoya. The Tōkaidō Main Line railway connecting Tokyo with Osaka also ran through the city, and it became one of the 57 regional population centers added to the list of targets by General Curtis LeMay in June 1945 following the destruction of Japan's main cities.

== Air raids ==
On July 19, 1945, 126 B-29 Superfortress bombers of the USAAF 20th Air Force, 314th Bombardment Wing departed from Guam in the Mariana Islands. On the same day, air raids were also launched against Fukui, Hitachi, and Chōshi. The B-29s arrived over target at Okazaki after midnight on June 20, 1945, and found the target mostly obscured by clouds. Bombing commenced at 0052 hours from an altitude of 3900 meters, and a total of 12,506 Incendiary bombs were dropped on the city, destroying most of the city center. The Okazaki city hall survived the attack; however at 1230 hours, a flight of P-38 Lightning fighters strafed civilians lined up at the city hall awaiting emergency medical treatment. The estimated total civilian casualties were 203 people killed, 13 missing, 32,068 injured with 7312 houses destroyed and 230 houses partially destroyed. The bombing rendered about one third of the city's population homeless. The Imperial Japanese Navy’s Okazaki Air Field and a large textile plant owned by Nisshinbo Industries were undamaged in the attack, which was aimed solely at the destruction of the city's civilian population.

A year after the war, the United States Army Air Forces's Strategic Bombing Survey (Pacific War) reported that 32.2 percent of the city had been destroyed.

== See also ==
- Air raids on Japan
- Evacuations of civilians in Japan during World War II
- Grave of the Fireflies (short story), a semi-autobiographical short story set during the bombing
