= Bombing of Utsunomiya in World War II =

Bombing of Utsonomiya
- Part of the air raids on Japan during the Pacific War
| Date | 1945 |
| Location | Utsunomiya, Japan |
| Result | American victory |

Belligerents
| United States | Japan |

Strength
| 133 bombers | |

Casualties and losses
| 1 | 628 civilians killed (most common estimates); 47,976 homeless 9,190 buildings destroyed |

The bombing of Utsunomiya (宇都宮空襲, Utsunomiya kūshū) on July 12, 1945, was part of the strategic bombing campaign waged by the United States against military and civilian targets and population centers during the Japan home islands campaign in the closing stages of the Pacific War in 1945.

== Background ==
Utsunomiya was a major garrison location for the Imperial Japanese Army (home base for the IJA 14th Division and IJA 51st Division, and regional command center) and the location of numerous war industries, including a factory for Nakajima Aircraft Company. It was also a regional commercial and transportation hub on the Tohoku Main Line railway connecting Tokyo with northern Honshu. However, in the early stages of the American bombing campaign it was untouched as strategic planners concentrated on major civilian population centers in southern and western Japan. This situation changed in July 1945 and Utsunomiya was attacked five times between July 10, 1945, and the end of the war.

== Air raids ==
Utsunomiya was first attacked on July 10, 1945, by carrier-based fighter aircraft, which strafed a farmhouse on the southern outskirts of the city, killing five civilians.

The major attack on Utsunomiya came on the night of July 12, 1945. A total of 133 B-29 Superfortresses from the USAAF 58th Bombardment Wing launched from Tinian, and arrived over Utsunomiya in several waves starting from 2319 hours. The weather over the target was overcast with rain. Using the Utsunomiya Central Elementary School as the target point, the aircraft dropped 802.9 tons of bombs, including 10,500 E46 incendiary cluster bombs (the same as were used in the Bombing of Tokyo), and 2204 M47 napalm bombs. The resultant firestorm destroyed much of the city center, including the Utsunomiya City Hall, Tochigi Prefectural Hall, and Utsunomiya Station. However, with poor visibility, many bombers released their payloads blindly (one crew reported that they released bombs when the smell of the burning city was strongest), and damage occurred over a wide area, including many farming villages surrounding the city. The Americans lost one aircraft en route back to Tinian with two casualties due to mechanical failure.

As a result of the bombing, the Japanese suffered 628 killed, 1150 severely injured, with 9490 buildings destroyed and 47,976 people rendered homeless. A year after the war, the United States Army Air Forces's Strategic Bombing Survey (Pacific War) reported that 43.6 percent of the city had been totally destroyed.

Utsunomiya was attacked again by Iwo Jima-based fighter aircraft on July 28, 1945, with minor damage and five people killed in an industrial park. However, another 30 civilians were killed when an American aircraft strafed a train at Koganei Station.

Fighter aircraft strafed Utsunomiya again on July 30, 1945, and August 13, 1945, killing around ten civilians in each attack.

== See also ==
- Evacuations of civilians in Japan during World War II
- Grave of the Fireflies (short story), a semi-autobiographical short story set during the bombing
