= Bombing of Gifu in World War II =

The Bombing of Gifu (岐阜空襲, Gifu kūshū) on July 9, 1945 was part of the air raids on Japan campaign waged by the United States of America against military and civilian targets and population centers during the Japan home islands campaign in the closing stages of the Pacific War.

== Background ==
The city of Gifu was a prefectural capital and regional transportation hub and home to a factory of Kawanishi Aircraft Company. With the neighboring city of Kakamigahara serving as an aeronautics center for Japan, Gifu was also a large industrial center during the Pacific War, including a downtown manufacturing sector. Gifu also served as the base for the creation of Japan's fire balloons. These paper-based, bomb-carrying hot air balloons were used in a failed attempt to cause havoc on American soil.

== Air raids ==
On the night of July 9, 1945, 135 USAAF Boeing B-29 Superfortress bombers of the 21st Air Division and 314th Air Division attacked the city of Gifu from the south, via Lake Biwa and Sekigahara. The bombing commenced at 23:34, with primary aiming point being the intersection of Japan National Route 248 with Gifu Prefectural Road 54. Due to the flat topography of the city and ideal weather conditions, the incendiary bombing created a firestorm which destroyed most of the center of the city, including the Gifu Prefectural Office, Gifu Station, and numerous other train stations and factories. The attack concluded at 0:20 AM the following morning. In total, 421.4 tons of E-46 and 477.4 tons of E-47 incendiary bombs were dropped on the city. Efforts by citizens and civil defense authorities to extinguish the napalm-filled bomblets using traditional water bucket brigades contributed to the casualties and extent of damage.

Due to the topography of Gifu city center and the weather conditions at that time, the damage per bomb dropped was huge. The affected area was around six square kilometers. The air raid killed 818 civilians, and injured 1059, with 20,363 homes destroyed, rendering 100,000 people effectively homeless.

A year after the war, the United States Army Air Forces's Strategic Bombing Survey (Pacific War) reported that 74 percent of the city had been destroyed.

== See also ==
- Air raids on Japan
- Evacuations of civilians in Japan during World War II
