= Bombing of Hamamatsu in World War II =

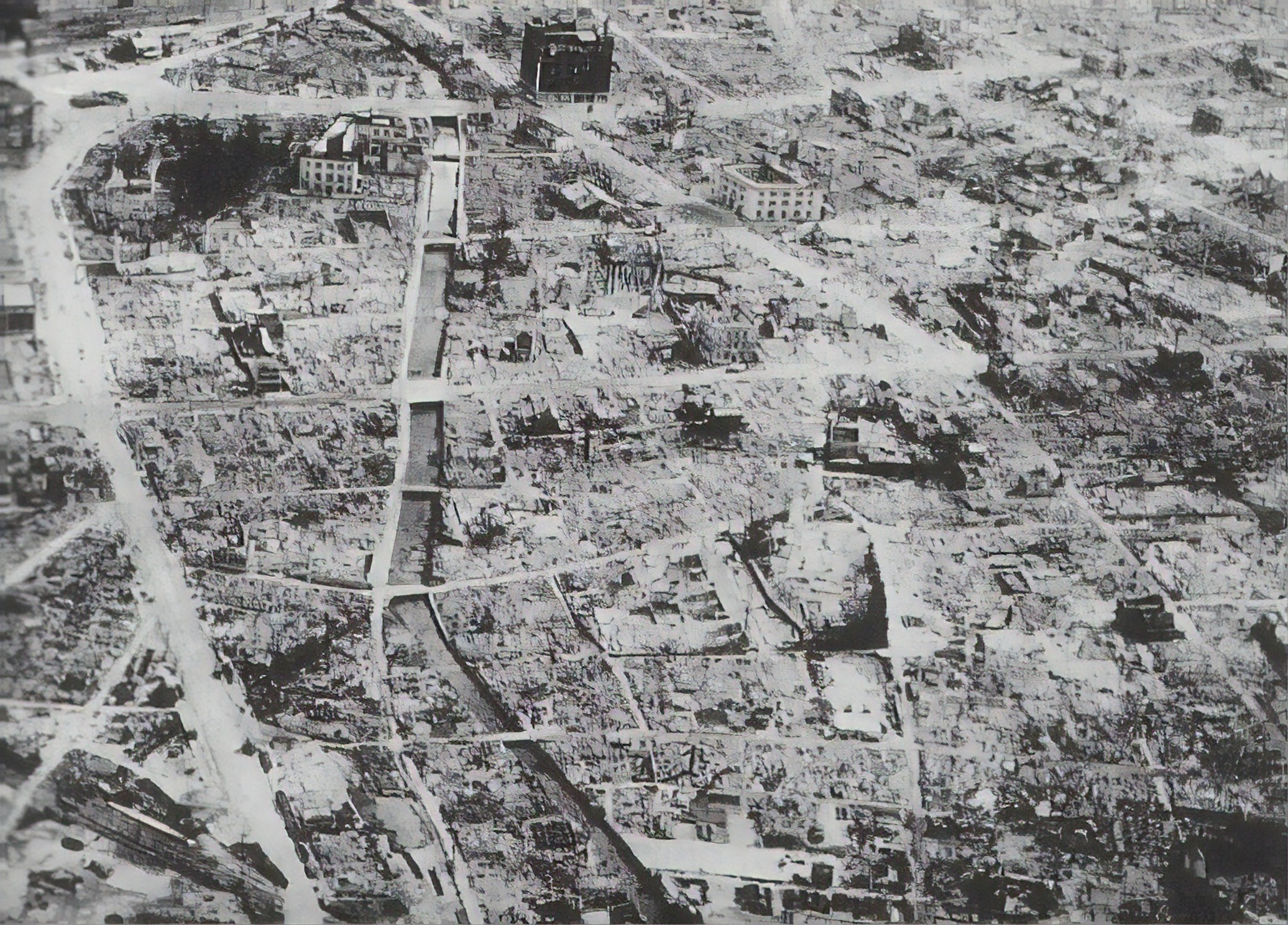
Hamamatsu after the 1945 air raids

The bombing of Hamamatsu (浜松空襲, Hamamatsu kūshū) was part of the strategic bombing campaign waged by the United States of America against military and civilian targets and population centers of the Empire of Japan during the Japan home islands campaign in the closing stages of the Pacific War in 1945.

== Background ==
The city of Hamamatsu was a target for air raids by the United States Army Air Forces on several occasions during the Pacific War. In addition to strategic bombing, Hamamatsu was also subject to tactical air raids launched by United States Navy carrier-based aircraft, and was bombarded by United States and Royal Navy warships on July 29, 1945.

Hamamatsu, in addition to being a major transportation hub on the Tōkaidō Main Line railway connecting Tokyo with Osaka, had several targets of military significance. It was the location of armaments factories, including Shōwa Yakuhin, Nakajima Aircraft Company, and Suzuki Motors. It was also the location of the Hamamatsu Flight School of the Imperial Japanese Army Air Force and a major military air field. Hamamatsu was also situated on the main flight route from Saipan to either Nagoya or Tokyo and was thus often assigned as a secondary target.

In 1945, Hamamatsu city had an estimated population of 166,346 people. A year after the war, the United States Army Air Forces's Strategic Bombing Survey (Pacific War) reported that 60.3 percent of the city had been totally destroyed.

== Attacks ==
- February 15, 1945 – 54 B-29 Superfortress bombers from the USAAF 20th Air Force attacked the Mitsubishi Motors factory in southern Hamamatsu. Six B-29s were shot down. 150 people on ground were killed.
- April 30, 1945 – 69 B-29 bombers launched a firebombing attack on central Hamamatsu; an estimated 1,000 civilians were killed.
- May 14, 1945 – 135 B-29 bombers of the 314th Bombardment Wing attacked residential areas in eastern and north-eastern Hamamatsu in a daylight raid; an estimated 450 civilians were killed.
- May 19, 1945 – In a follow-on night mission, 32 B-29s of the 330th Bombardment Group (VH) bombed the south Nagoya urban area. An estimated 450 people were killed.
- June 18, 1945 – An unknown number of B-29 bombers launched a major firebombing raid on central Hamamatsu, creating a firestorm which destroyed most of the city; the estimated death toll was 1,800 people.
- July 29, 1945 – Three American battleships and one British battleship bombard Hamamatsu, and a follow-on air US raid took place against recently repaired Hamamatsu rail lines, Hamamatsu Station, and nearby factories 170 people were killed.

== See also ==
- Air raids on Japan
- Evacuations of civilians in Japan during World War II
