= Japanese invasion of Cagayan de Oro =

Japanese Invasion of Cagayan de Oro
- Part of the Philippines campaign (1941–1942), Pacific Theater
| Date | May 2, 1942 – May 6, 1942 |
| Location | Cagayan de Misamis, Misamis |
| Result | Japanese victory: Filipino-American forces retreat towards Sayre Highway in Bukidnon |

Belligerents
| Japan | United States: Philippines |

Commanders and leaders
| (Empire of Japan) Kawamura Saburo | (United States) William F. Sharp (United States) William P. Morse (United States) Hiram Tarkington (United States) John P. Woodridge (United States) Allen Thayer (United States) Joseph Webb |

Units involved
| Ground units: Japanese Fourteenth Army: Kawamura detachment; 9th Infantry Regiment; 41st Infantry Regiment; Armored Detachment; Artillery Batteries; Air units: Japanese 5th Air Army: 22nd Air Brigade; Naval units: Japanese Imperial Navy: 2nd Fleet | Ground units: Philippine Commonwealth Army: 103rd Infantry Regiment; 62nd Infantry Regiment; 81st Field Artillery Regiment (Fighting as Infantry); 61st Field Artillery Regiment (Fighting as Infantry); Civilian Home Volunteers; Philippine Constabulary: Misamis PC Company; Air units: US Army Air Corps: 30th US Bombardment Squadron (Ground Echelon) |

Strength
| 4,500 Soldiers 4 Destroyers 2 Cruisers 11 Transports | 6,500 Soldiers 200 Philippine Constabularies 2 P40 Warhawks |

Casualties and losses
| 450 | 1,200 |

Japanese Invasion in Cagayan de Oro, (Filipino: Paglusob ng mga Hapones sa Cagayan de Oro, Cebuano: Pagsulong sa mga Hapon sa Cagayan de Oro) a military conflict during early days of World War II in the Philippines. It took place from May 6 to 12, 1942. Their main objective was to capture vital Del Monte Fields and link with Sakaguchi Detachment from the south via Sayre Highway.

== Background ==
At the start of the war, Cagayan de Misamis in Misamis Oriental Province and Northern Coast of Mindanao has no army troops posted only PC constables and local policemen. The 1st Battalion, 101st Infantry under Major John McGee was posted in Tankulan in Bukidnon Province in order to guard Del Monte Field. In December, the 2nd Battalion, 102nd Infantry under Major William Baldwin was transported via sea from Zamboanga but before end of the year, the battalion was transferred to south in Cotabato.

In December 1941, General William F. Sharp, commander of Visayas-Mindanao Force, ordered troops from the Visayas Islands to transfer to Mindanao in order to bolster its defenses anticipating that supplies and reinforcements from Australia would be coming from the island and transported to Bataan and other islands. Between January 2 and 3, 1942 these troops arrived in different areas. The 61st Infantry and 73rd Infantry from Negros arrived via Iligan to bolster Lanao sector. The 61st Field Artillery and 62nd Infantry from Panay arrived via Bugo and Iligan, respectively. The 81st Field Artillery Regiment from Bohol arrived in Bugo port in Misamis. The 93rd Infantry and 81st Infantry arrived in Surigao from Leyte.

In February, United States Army Forces in the Far East headquarters informed General Sharp that 600 officers and men under Colonel William P. Morse from Bataan mostly airmen from deplaned squadrons were on their way to Mindanao. They were to fight as infantry and starting arming them with rifles. Sharp activated Cagayan brigade under Colonel Morse and had the 61st Field Artillery and 81st Field Artillery under its command. Later in the month 103rd Infantry (less 3rd Bn) under Major Joseph Webb was transported via land arrived from the Cotabato-Davao Sector. In March, the 62nd Infantry under Lieutenant Colonel Allen Thayer was ordered to transfer to the sector from Lanao via land. Due to lack of motor transports the regiment hiked through the trails from Dansalan to Malaybalay. It was moved straight to Cagayan and posted in Tagoloan River.

On the stopover of General Douglas MacArthur in Mindanao for his relocation to Australia from March 16 to 17, he authorized the activation of 102nd Infantry Division under Colonel Morse whose Cagayan Brigade has expanded. This division was tasked to defend the northern coast of Mindanao.

== Japanese landing ==
After securing Panay island, the Kawamura detachment under Major General Kawamura Saburo were preparing to its redeployment in Mindanao. They were relieved by 10th Independent Garrisons on April 28 and boarded naval transports escorted with destroyers for Northern Mindanao.

On May 2, 1942, the detachment and naval task group appeared in Macajalar Bay, in early morning they landed in several sectors of the Cagayan de Misamis coast including Bugo port. Due to the absence of a single artillery gun in the sector the landing was easy and defenders was unable to prevent it. The 103rd Infantry under Major Webb attacked the beachhead with two companies that almost threw the Japanese back to the sea.

=== Withdrawal ===
The 81st Field Artillery that posted at the right of 61st Field Artillery withdrew due to overwhelming number of Japanese. Colonel Tarkington of 61st Field Artillery ordered his regiment to withdraw, seeing his right flank was exposed. The 103rd Infantry, which attacked the Japanese on their beachhead, was also forced to withdraw as its right flank was exposed, and in fear of being encircled, Major Webb withdrew towards Talakag and 62nd Infantry, the last unit to withdraw, went towards Sayre Highway.

The Japanese were in total control of the Northern Coast with the capture of Macabalan and Bugo ports, and could land more troops and supplies. The 62nd Infantry was posted in Alae Junction to guard the next move of the Japanese. The 102nd Division failed on defending the beach landings due to lack of artillery and firepower.

== See also ==
- 102nd Infantry Division
- Mindanao Force
- Visayas-Mindanao Force
- Kawamura Detachment
- William F. Sharp
- William P. Morse
