= Bombing of Shizuoka in World War II =

Bombing of Shizuoka
- Part of the air raids on Japan, as part of the Pacific War
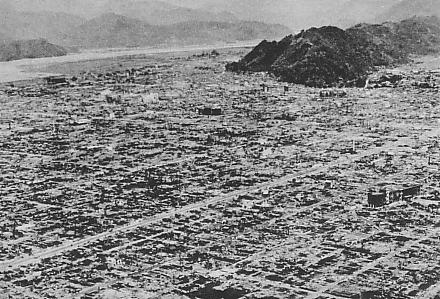
- Shizuoka after the 1945 air raid
Date	19 June 1945
Location	Shizuoka, Japan
Result	American victory

Belligerents
United States	Japan

Strength
137 B-29 bombers from the 314th Bombardment Wing	Unknown number of antiaircraft guns

Casualties and losses
2 aircraft destroyed in mid-air collision	1,952 civilians killed 12,000 severely injured

The bombing of Shizuoka (静岡大空襲, Shizuoka dai-kūshū) on June 19, 1945, was part of the strategic bombing campaign waged by the United States against military and civilian targets and population centers during the Japan home islands campaign in the closing stages of the Pacific War in 1945.

== Background ==
Although the city of Shizuoka lacked major targets of military significance, it was the 15th largest city in Japan per the 1940 census with an estimated population in 1945 of 212,000, and was a major regional commercial center. The Tōkaidō Main Line railway connecting Tokyo with Osaka also ran through the city.

== Air raids ==
Shizuoka was bombed a total of ten times during the war. Tactical raids with high explosive bombs were made against a defunct Mitsubishi aircraft engine plant in March, April, May, and on June 7, 1945, a tactical raid by B-29 Superfortresses caused moderate damage to Shizuoka's industrial areas.

On June 19, 1945, 137 B-29 bombers from the USAAF 314th Bombardment Wing launched a major firebombing attack on the central part of the city. The bombers attacked in two waves from east and west, so as to trap the population within the center of the city, between the mountains and the sea, dropping 13,211 incendiary bombs. The resultant firestorm destroyed most of the city. Shizuoka civil defense measures were crude at best and the city had almost no antiaircraft batteries. Air raid shelters consisted of a hole in the ground next to wooden houses with a wooden roof covered with a thin layer of soil and clay. Due to the high ground water levels in the area, these shelters were shallow, and many people were burned alive in the firestorm. The estimated civilian casualties in the June 19 raid were 1,952 people killed, an estimated 12,000 were severely injured, and 26,891 homes were destroyed. A year after the war, the United States Army Air Forces's Strategic Bombing Survey (Pacific War) reported that 66.1 percent of the city had been totally destroyed.

Two B-29s collided mid-air during the operation, resulting in the deaths of 23 Americans. In 2008, a headstone with the names of the fallen Airmen was erected in front of the previous Japanese monument in the city. A joint US-Japan memorial service is held each year at the site on the Saturday closest to the day the crash occurred. The book The Blackened Canteen, by Jerry Yellin, a P-51 pilot, tells the story.

== See also ==
- Air raids on Japan
- Evacuations of civilians in Japan during World War II
- Grave of the Fireflies (short story), a semi-autobiographical short story set during the bombing
