= Action of 24 July 1945 =

Pacific naval battle of World War Two

- Part of World War II, Pacific War
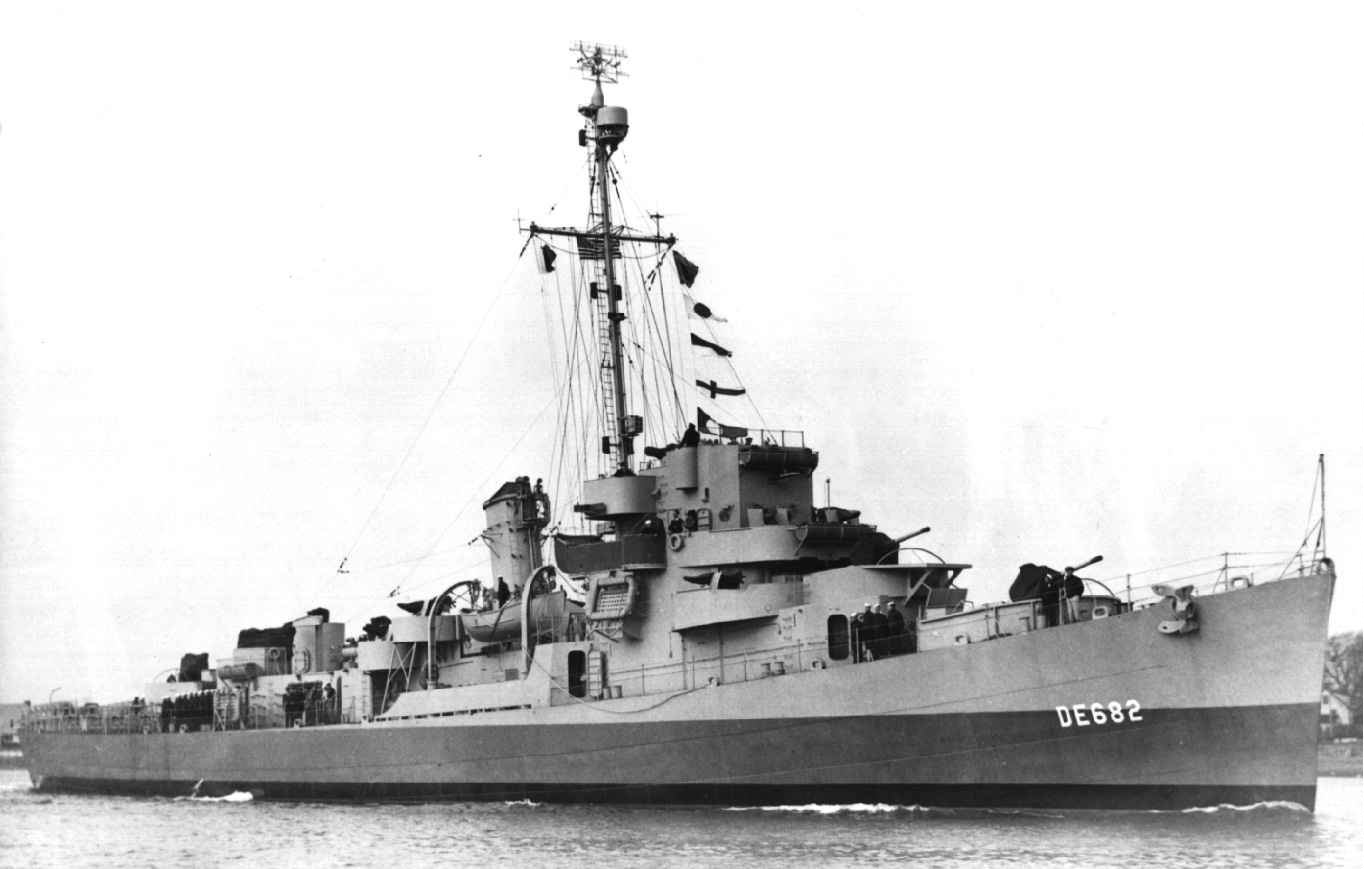
- USS Underhill during World War II.
Date	24 July 1945
Location	off Luzon, Philippines 16.989°N 122.818°E
Result	Japanese victory

Belligerents
United States	Japan

Commanders and leaders
Robert M. Newcomb †	(Empire of Japan) Saichi Oba

Strength
1 destroyer escort 7 submarine chasers 1 patrol boat 1 troopship 6 LSTs	Sea: 1 submarine 4 kaitens Air: 1 bomber

Casualties and losses
112 killed 122 wounded 1 destroyer escort sunk	4 killed 4 kaiten sunk

The action of 24 July 1945 was one of the final naval battles during the Pacific Theater of World War II. In an attempt to destroy as many allied ships as possible, the Imperial Japanese Navy began arming their submarine fleet with manned torpedoes called kaitens. The Action of 24 July 1945 concerns the battle between a convoy of U.S. Navy warships off Luzon and the Japanese submarine I-53 and her kaitens.

== Action ==
In July 1945, the destroyer escort Underhill—under Lieutenant Commander Robert M. Newcomb—was assigned flagship of a convoy carrying United States Army soldiers of the 96th Infantry Division from Okinawa to the Philippines. The convoy included eight other escorts: the submarine chasers PC-1251, PC-803, PC-804, PC-807, SC-1306, and SC-1309, and the patrol boat PCE-872. These vessels were tasked with delivering six LSTs and the troopship Adria. Underhill found the convoy off Buckner Bay, Okinawa on or about 21 July and, three days later the American ships were steaming around 250 mi (220 nmi; 400 km) northeast of Cape Engano and nearing their destination. That day, on 24 July, a Japanese bomber—scouting for I-53—appeared. Lt. Cdr. Newcomb ordered his ships to battle stations but the bomber remained outside the ships' range. Forty-five minutes later, the convoy was sailing southwest when Commander Saichi Oba released his six kaiten and sent them forward. Other accounts say that there were at least eight kaiten involved in the attack though only a single Japanese submarine participated, and it was designed to carry four kaiten. The kaiten were presumably manned by Sub-Lieutenant Jun Katsuyama, Ensign Toyooki Seki and Flight Petty Officers 1st Class Tsutoma Kawajiri and Masahiro Arakawa. They were armed with a 3,000 lb (1,400 kg) explosive, equivalent to two torpedoes, and once released could not be retrieved.

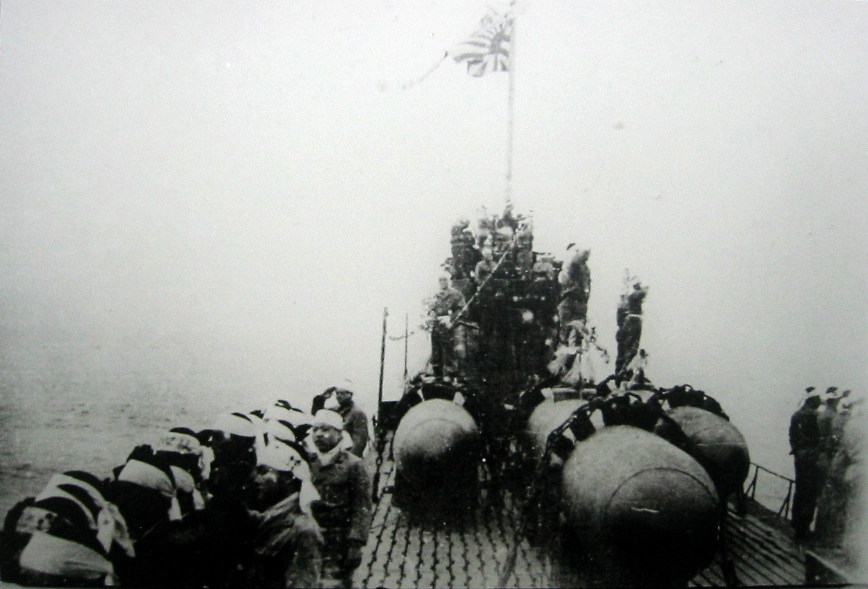
Three kaitens aboard a Japanese submarine during the war.

To divert the American convoy into the path of the kaiten, Cdr. Oba released a dummy mine which was observed and engaged by the guns of Underhill. After several direct hits, the mine was determined to be a dud by the Americans and they continued on with their patrol. At this time, one of the submarine chasers lost power and had to be towed by PCE-872. Shortly thereafter, a sonar contact was made, so Underhill and PC-804 began depth charging the area. The destroyer escort is credited with sinking one of the kaiten at this point while another attacked PC-804. It missed the chaser and the kaiten turned around for a surface attack on Underhill. But as soon as the mini submarine was out of water, Lt. Cdr. Newcomb ordered a ramming maneuver because the kaiten was too close for his guns to bear. Underhill then sailed right over the kaiten and it exploded at 15:15 along with the escort's boilers and readied ammunition. Underhill was torn in two, the bow section of the ship quickly sank with all hands, the aft section remained afloat until being sunk by American gunfire the following day. All 122 survivors were wounded in action and each sailor received a Purple Heart. Lt. Cdr. Newcomb was killed and he was posthumously awarded the Silver Star. Two of the remaining American warships depth charged the area for an hour after Underhill was destroyed, but I-53 escaped and arrived back in Japan a month later, just before the end of the war. The last of the American survivors were picked up after at least an hour of being in the water though rescue operations continued until 18:30 that night. Most of the survivors were in need of urgent medical assistance which they received on PC-803 and LST-647. The engagement was one of the last in the Pacific War and was one of the few victories of the Japanese kaiten program.

== See also ==
- Kamikaze
- USS Mississinewa (AO-59)
- USS Indianapolis (CA-35)
