= Japanese invasion of Zamboanga =

Part of the Japanese invasion of the Philippines, 1942

Location	May 1, 1942 – May 12, 1942
Result	Japanese victory: Japan firmly controls the island of Mindanao until its capitulation
Territorial changes	Port city of Zamboanga fell to the Japanese

Belligerents
United States of America: Commonwealth of the Philippines	Empire of Japan

Commanders and leaders
(United States) Alvin T. Wilson (United States) Lawrence Prichard (United States) Jay E. Tremaine (United States) R.D Winne (Philippines) Jose D. Garcia (Philippines) Juan Crisologo	(Empire of Japan) Fugiyama Rokuzo (Empire of Japan) Irifune Naosaburo (Empire of Japan) Yamada (Empire of Japan) Yamanouchi Junnosuke

Units involved
Philippine Commonwealth Army Ground units: Visayas-Mindanao Force; Zamboanga Sector Force; 1st Battalion, 102nd Infantry; 1st Battalion, 106th Infantry; Philippine Constabulary: Zamboanga PC Company	3rd Southern Expeditionary Fleet Ground units: 32nd Base Force; 2nd Kure Special Naval Landing Force; Escort Force: 1st Gun Boat Division; 51st Subchaser Division; Air Units: 32nd Air Group

Strength
1,000 Troops 200 PC	220 Naval Infantrymen; 1 Light Cruiser; 1 Torpedo Boat; 2 Gunboats; 2 Subchaser Boat 7 Seaplanes

Japanese invasion of Zamboanga (Filipino: Paglusob ng mga Hapones sa Zamboanga, Chavacano: El Invasion na maga Japones de Zamboanga) took place in March 1942 as part of Mindanao siege during Japanese campaign to invade the Philippines in December 1941 to May 1942.

== Background ==
On December 25, 1941, after the capture of Davao City, Sakaguchi Detachment invaded Jolo, Sulu in preparation of its invasion of Borneo in Dutch East Indies. Japanese did not attempt another landing in main Mindanao until April 1942 where massive reinforcement landed in Central West Coast area and Northern Mindanao.

=== Zamboanga Sector ===
Zamboanga peninsula was initially under the command of Lieutenant Colonel William F. Dalton and Provisional Battalion, 43rd US Infantry under Major Allen Peck and a PC Company was the only combat unit it has. Their main mission is to guard the Wolfe Air Field until its expansion is completed as US Far East Air Force considered as one of B17 Heavy Bomber based.

In November 1941 1st Battalion, 102nd Infantry (PA) arrived from Davao for the refresher training course. In March when Mindanao Force was established, General Sharp the force commander ordered Colonel Dalton and Major Peck's Philippine Scout Battalion to transfer to Lake Pinamaloy in Bukidnon to established an Infantry and Artillery school which Philippine Scouts of Major Peck will serve as instructors.

Colonel Wilson took over the command of the sector and Mindanao Force headquarters sent Major Lawrence Prichard to serve as his executive. Preparation was intensified and in January 1942 a provisional battalion composed of school boys was organized under the command of Major Jose D. Garcia of the Philippine Army. A PC Company under Major Juan Crisologo guard the interior of the city and also in charge of the Japanese internees.

=== Combat Narratives ===
On February 26, 1942, Japanese Reconnaissance Seaplanes from Davao base started to do reconnaissance in Zamboanga, bombed defending troops position. On the following day February 27, a report reached Colonel Wilson's headquarters in Zamboanga City of Task forces converging to the city from Davao, Jolo, and from the North. Demolition charges was laid to the bridges and destruction of Petitt Barracks was executed by Major R.D Winne to avoid capture of them by the Japanese. Colonel Wilson ordered the two battalions to their battle positions. At 0240 hours invasion force arrived off Zamboanga, and the land combat units were landed.

Overall command of the invasion force was under Vice Admiral Fugiyama Rokuzo commander of 3rd Southern Expeditionary Fleet. Landing force is under Rear Admiral Irifune Naosaburo but handed it over to Lieutenant (Navy) Yamada after a week and left for Davao. With no means of stopping the Japanese from landing, General Sharp ordered Colonel Wilson to the hills and fight as guerilla. On March 2, 1942, Colonel Wilson's troops counterattacked but with Naval and seaplanes they were repulsed. 1st Battalion, 102nd Infantry who came from Davao whose training was cut short and officers lack of leadership quality who has been not so keen in fighting and dying in Zamboanga. In contrast the Provisional Battalion, 106th Infantry under Major Jose D. Garcia who came mostly from Zamboanga had a good conduct of themselves being more loyal and tenacious among both officers and men being Zamboangans.

Major Juan Crisologo commander of PC units and Major Tremain the Force Surgeon raided the city for supplies and medicines. Which caught the Japanese by surprised and made them confused. The Filipinos attacked them frontal with rifles and Thompson submachineguns, machinegun nests are knockout with grenades before they were stopped by well placed machinegun nest. Major Crisologo and Tremaine decided to withdraw at dawn as Japanese alertness waned.

== Aftermath ==
The Japanese gained in control of the waterfront of Zamboanga City and Wolfe Field. Japanese objective is just to secure Zamboanga City and not to chase the Fil-American force eastward to the peninsula. Japanese able to free their interned citizens in Zamboanga and choke up the western coast of any transports from and to Luzon dooming the Luzon Force in Bataan.
