= Battle of Sagami Bay =

1945 naval battle of the Japanese coast in WWII

- Part of World War II
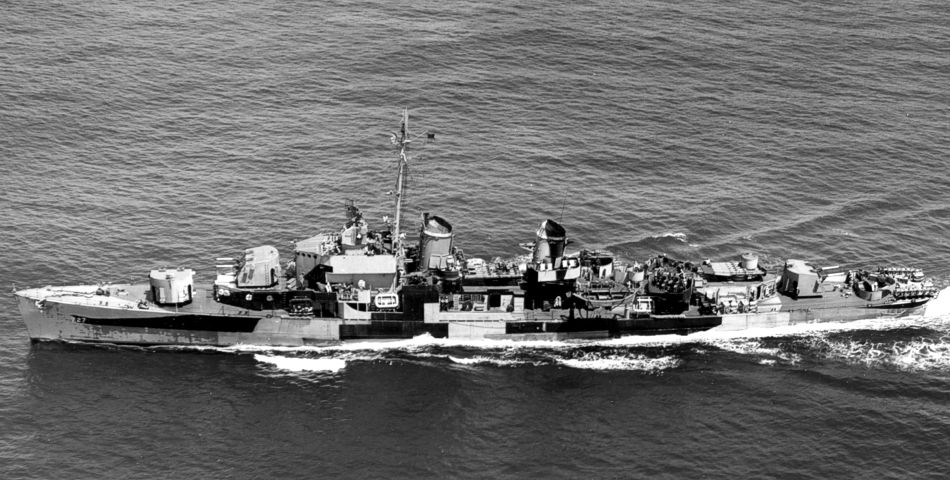
- USS De Haven (DD-727), the destroyer which led the attack, underway in 1944.
Date	22–23 July 1945
Location	off Bōsō Peninsula 34.50°N 139.50°E
Result	American victory

Belligerents
United States	Japan

Commanders and leaders
(United States) T.H. Hederman	(Empire of Japan) Unknown

Units involved
United States Navy Destroyer Squadron 61	(Empire of Japan) Imperial Japanese Navy

Strength
9 destroyers	1 minesweeper 1 submarine chaser 2 freighters

Casualties and losses
None	1 freighter sunk 1 freighter damaged

The Battle of Sagami Bay was a World War II anti-shipping raid off the tip of Bōsō Peninsula on the night of 22 July 1945. It was the last surface action of the war.

Destroyer Squadron 61 (DesRon 61) of the U.S. Navy engaged with a Japanese convoy consisting of two freighters escorted by subchaser No. 42 and minesweeper No.1. The Americans sank a freighter, No.5 Hakutetsu Maru of 800 long tons (810 t), and damaged another freighter, Enbun Maru of 6,919 long tons (7,030 t). The Japanese escorts were not damaged. The Enbun Maru and the escorts evacuated to Tateyama Bay.
