= Japanese invasion of Parang =

Japanese Invasion of Parang
- Part of Japanese Invasion of Mindanao
Date	April 29, 1942
Location	Parang, Empire Province of Cotabato
Result	Japanese victory: Philippine troops forced to withdraw

Belligerents
Empire of Japan	United States of America: Commonwealth of the Philippines

Commanders and leaders
Major General Kawaguchi Kiyotake	Lieutenant Colonel Calixto Duque

Units involved
Kawaguchi Detachment: 35th Infantry Brigade	2nd Infantry (Regular) Regiment (Philippines)

Strength
3,000 IJA Soldiers 4 Cruisers 11 Transports	600

The Battle of Parang, Cotabato in 1942 saw the Japanese Kawaguchi Detachment land on the shores of Parang town in Cotabato province, Philippines, on April 29, 1942, as part of their invasion of Mindanao, facing resistance from the Philippine Army's 2nd Regular Regiment under Lieutenant Colonel Calixto Duque, who managed to delay the Japanese advance for several hours despite eventually being forced to withdraw due to the overwhelming Japanese forces and the fall of nearby Cotabato City; this battle marked a key point in the Japanese occupation of southern Mindanao.

== Background ==
Philippine Army posted 2nd Infantry Regiment part of 1st Infantry Division a regular unit of Philippine Commonwealth Army. The regiment homebased was in Camp Luna in Parang, Cotabato (now Maguindanao). In October 1941 Lieutenant Colonel Calixto Duque, replaced Colonel Fidel Segundo as he was appointed as Superintendent of Philippine Military Academy. In preparation of the defense of Parang and Polloc Harbor. Duque trained his inexperienced men almost everyday but with limited arms, ammunition, and fresh recruits that composing his regiment he relegated to just delay the advance of the Japanese as long as his unit can and withdraw to Lanao or Cotabato City.

=== Invasion ===
On April 26, 1942, Kawaguchi Detachment left Cebu for Lanao and Cotabato. In April 28, Zamboanga Force reported to Mindanao Force HQ of the Naval Task Force with 11 transports carrying Kawaguchi Detachment passing Zamboanga. Mindanao HQ informed 81st Division HQ and 101st Division HQ to prepare.

=== Japanese Landings ===
April 29, 1942 The Kawaguchi Detachment landed simultaneously in both Cotabato City and Parang, aiming to secure the vital highway connecting the two areas.

Philippine Defense

The 2nd Regular Regiment under Colonel Duque was tasked to defend Parang, putting up a strong resistance on the beachhead, delaying the Japanese advance with their well-positioned defenses. For six hours with this stubborn defense they held the Japanese at bay in their beachhead and not go inland.

Withdrawal and Retreat

Despite their initial resistance, the Filipino forces were eventually forced to withdraw from Parang due to the superior Japanese firepower and the fall of Cotabato City, which left them vulnerable to encirclement. Duque retreated inland a prepared as route of retreat. His unit reached Lanao and put under 81st Division's command.

Kawaguchi forces captured Parang and cleared its highway then moved northward to link of the forces in Malabang. They moved northward to capture Dansalan in Lanao with the objective of linking with the Kawamura Detachment in Cagayan.

Duque's resolute leadership was largely responsible for preventing the enemy from gaining in is rear areas and preserved the combat integrity of his regiment. He was still fighting astride the main approach to his rear when the Mindanao Operations came to an end on May 20, 1942.
