= Japan campaign =

Campaign in Japan during the Second World War

- Part of the Pacific War of World War II
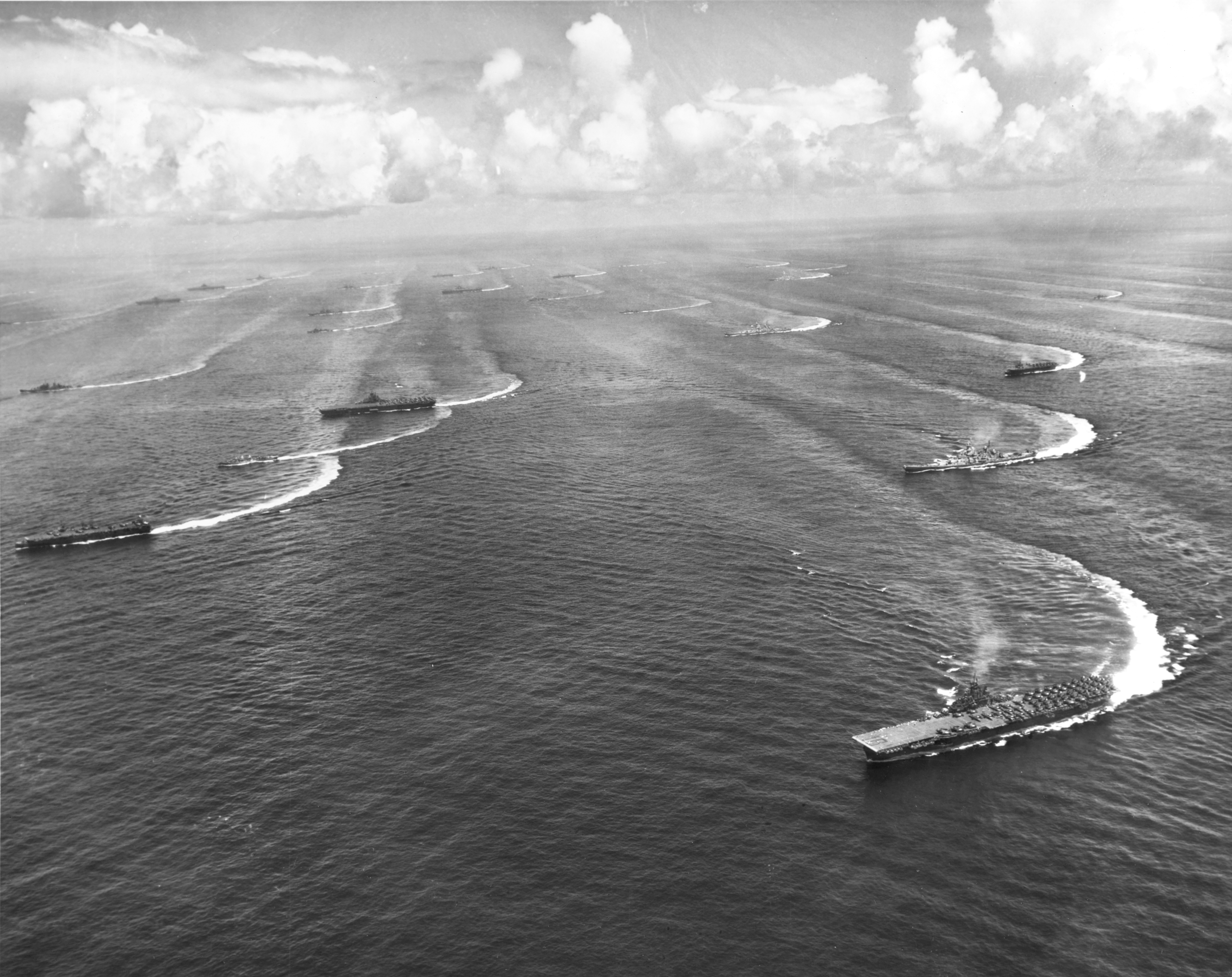
- Task Force 38, of the U.S. Third Fleet maneuvering off the coast of Japan, 17 August 1945, two days after Japan agreed to surrender.
Date	18 April 1942 – 2 September 1945
Location	Mainland and Japan Islands, Pacific
Result	Allied victory
Territorial changes	American-led occupation of Japan

Belligerents
United States; United Kingdom; Canada; New Zealand; Australia; Soviet Union (from August 1945)	Japan

Commanders and leaders
Franklin D. Roosevelt Harry S. Truman Douglas MacArthur William Halsey Jr. Henry H. Arnold Chester W. Nimitz Bernard Rawlings Aleksandr Vasilevsky	Hirohito (surrendered) Hideki Tojo Shunroku Hata Kiichiro Higuchi Tadamichi Kuribayashi (PKIA) Mitsuru Ushijima ‡‡ Matome Ugaki ‡‡ Seiichi Itō †

Casualties and losses
approximately 19,000 to 20,000	193,300 soldiers dead (all causes); Surrendered and captured following blockade and bombings: 4,335,000 soldiers 9,435 artillery pieces 5,286 tanks 731 other AFVs; 12,682 aircraft (mostly kamikazes)

The Japan campaign was a series of battles and engagements fought in and around the Japanese home islands, between Allied forces and the forces of Imperial Japan during the last stages of the Pacific campaign of World War II. The Japan campaign lasted from April 1942 to the end of the Pacific War in September 1945.

== Air war ==
Periodic air raids on Japan were the first attacks undertaken by Allied forces against the Japanese mainland beginning with the Doolittle Raid in April 1942. In late 1944, these raids were followed by a major strategic bombing against cities, factories, and other war infrastructure throughout Japan, most notably:

- The Operation Meetinghouse raid on Tokyo (9-10 March 1945): 100,000 Japanese were killed, mostly civilians, including in the conflagration that followed the firebombing.
- The Bombing of Kure (24-28 July 1945): Most of the surviving large Japanese warships were sunk at anchor, leaving the Nagato as the only remaining capital ship in Japan's inventory.
- The Atomic bombing of Hiroshima (6 August 1945): Of approximately 90,000–140,000 deaths, 20,000 were Japanese combatants and 20,000 were Korean slave laborers.
- The Atomic bombing of Nagasaki (9 August 1945): Of approximately 39,000–80,000 deaths, 27,778 were Japanese munitions workers, 2,000 were Korean slave laborers, and 150 were Japanese combatants.

These air raids caused heavy damage to Japanese infrastructure and domestic industry, the deaths of 241,000–900,000 Japanese citizens (mostly civilians), and the loss thousands of aircraft and flak guns. The Allies, in turn, only lost a few hundred aircraft (mostly bombers) to Japanese anti-air defenses and fighters.

From March 1945 until the end of the war, the US Navy's Fast Carrier Task Force began operating in close proximity to the Japanese mainland with increasing impunity. American aircraft carriers continually struck Japanese airfields and dockyards for six months, in a series of air raids that the Japanese contested with decreasing frequency.

== Land and sea battles ==
In early 1945, there were two major island battles fought as part of the Japan campaign:

- The Battle of Iwo Jima (16 February to 26 March): Of approximately 21,000 Japanese defenders, only 216 survived.
- The Battle of Okinawa (1 April to 21 June): Of approximately 100,000 Japanese defenders, only 24,455 survived.

There were also two naval battles:

- Operation Ten-Go (7 April): All but four Japanese vessels committed were sunk by American carrier-borne aircraft.
- The Battle of Tokyo Bay (22-23 July 1945): Most of the Japanese vessels committed were heavily damaged or lost.

Allied warships also bombarded several Japanese cities during July and August 1945.

Fierce fighting during the battles of Iwo Jima and Okinawa generated a grim outlook for the eventual amphibious landings on the Japanese Home Islands among Allied strategists. Japanese ground troops had fought effective campaigns of attrition on both islands, and Allied naval forces were subjected to massive kamikaze attacks throughout the battle of Okinawa. In both cases, the Japanese refused to surrender and there were few survivors. While Japanese losses were near-complete, Allied forces also incurred tens of thousands of casualties during the fighting.

Naval operations of the Japan campaign included a suicidal Japanese counteroffensive on 7 April 1945 (Operation Ten-Go), tasked with the insurmountable objective of relieving Okinawa, as well as an Allied campaign to place air and submarine-delivered mines in Japanese shipping lanes. This was illustrated by the naval surface engagement at Tokyo Bay in July 1945.

In late 1945, the Soviet Union launched a series of successful offensives against several northern Japanese territories, in preparation for a possible invasion of Hokkaido:

- Invasion of South Sakhalin (11—25 August)
  - Maoka Landing (19—22 August)
- Invasion of the Kuril Islands (18 August to 1 September)
  - Battle of Shumshu (18—23 August)

== Conclusion ==
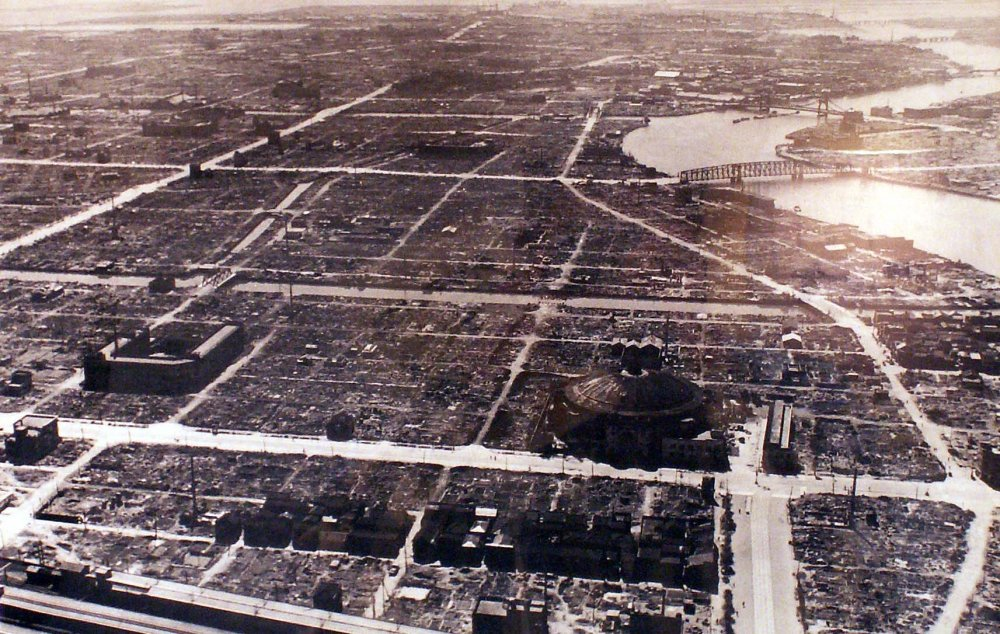
Tokyo from the air after the firebombing of Tokyo, 1945.

World War II ended with the surrender of Japan after the atomic bombings of Hiroshima and Nagasaki and the Soviet invasion of Manchuria. The firebombing of Japanese cities resulted in some 350,000 civilian deaths and devastated Japanese cities, but did not meaningfully push the Japanese government towards surrender. While offering lukewarm indications that it was prepared for peace talks, the Japanese government had also made preparations to contest an Allied invasion of the home islands as fiercely as they had defended Iwo Jima and Okinawa, including plans to carry out a protracted guerrilla campaign and carry out massed kamikaze strikes against Allied naval forces.

The intended purpose of the Japan campaign was to provide staging areas and preparation for a possible Allied invasion of Japan (tentatively scheduled for late 1945), support Allied air and naval operations against the Japanese mainland and further isolate Japan from its remaining overseas possessions. However, although the remaining vessels of the Imperial Japanese Navy had been largely sunk or immobilized and Japanese air units no longer contest Allied command of the skies by June-July 1945, Japan still maintained significant ground forces on the home islands.

Allied strategists judged that an amphibious invasion of the home islands would likely result in extremely heavy casualties. By July 1945, Japanese forces on the home islands had grown to nearly two million men, organized into units of varying quality and type, amounting to over 800,000 men on Kyushu alone. Japanese males aged 15-60 and women aged 17-40 were drafted into civilian militias, whose enlistment roles officially topped 25 million, and were often equipped only with spears or household weapons. Although Japan had ceded air superiority to the Allies, it maintained a reserve of some 9,000 aircraft, intended to be utilized as kamikazes during the impending Allied invasion. Japanese units had standing orders to engage in protracted guerrilla warfare should they be overrun.

By June 1945, the American military leadership had decided to continue and intensify the naval blockade and aerial bombardment of the home islands, hoping to compel a Japanese surrender prior to the planned invasion of Kyushu in November 1945. If the Japanese still refused to surrender after Allied forces invaded Kyushu, additional landings were planned on Honshu to seize Tokyo in early 1946.

Japan surrendered in August 1945, preventing these landings from taking place. Japan’s surrender is attributed to a mixture of factors, including the atomic bombings of Hiroshima and Nagasaki, the strategic bombing of Japanese cities, the tightening naval blockade of the home islands, and the Soviet invasion of Manchuria.

== See also ==
- Surrender of Japan
- Japanese Instrument of Surrender
- Japanese war crimes
- Occupation of Japan
- United States strategic bombing of Japan
- Soviet invasion of Manchuria — Launched by the Soviet Union after the first atomic bombing.
- Victory over Japan Day

== Sources ==
- Drea, Edward J. (1998). In the Service of the Emperor: Essays on the Imperial Japanese Army. Nebraska: University of Nebraska Press. ISBN 0-8032-1708-0.
