= M69 incendiary =

US Army Air Forces WWII incendiary bomblet

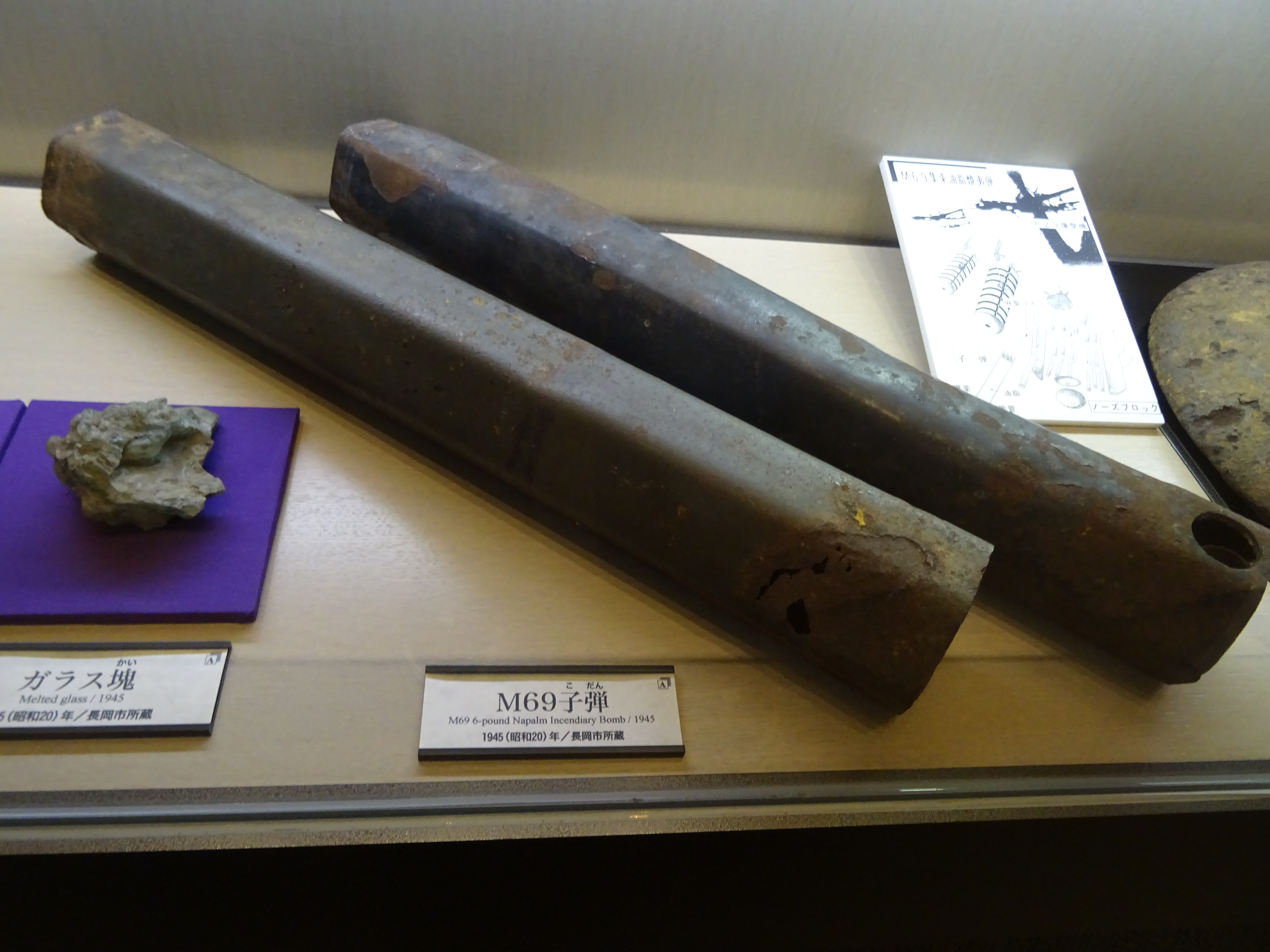
M69 napalm incendiary bomb, that were used in bombing of Nagaoka in 1945. Exhibit at Niigata Prefectural Museum of History.

The M69 incendiary bomblet was used in air raids on Japan and China during World War II, including the firebombing of Tokyo in 1945. It was created by the Standard Oil Development Company, whose work was funded by the Office of Scientific Research and Development. They were nicknamed "Tokyo calling cards". The M69 was a plain steel pipe with a hexagonal cross section 3 inches (76 mm) in diameter and 20 inches (510 mm) long. It weighed about 6 pounds (2.7 kg).

The bomblet used napalm as an incendiary filler, improving on earlier designs which used thermite or magnesium fillers that burned more intensely, but with less energy, were less weight-efficient, and were easier to extinguish. In Germany they were filled with jellied oil and dropped in clusters of 36 in the non-aerodynamic M19 bomb. Over Japan they were used in clusters of 38 as part of the finned E-46 'aimable cluster', which opened up at about 2,000 feet (610 m). After separation, each of the 38 M69s released a 3-foot (1 m) cotton streamer to orient its fuze downward. Upon hitting a building or the ground, the timing fuze burned for three to five seconds and then a small explosive charge (black powder in the standard M-69 type deployed operationally during WW2, white phosphorus in a later modification, the M-69X, which did not see wide use) ignited and propelled the incendiary filling up to 100 feet (30 m) in several flaming globs, instantly starting intense fires.

It was tested against typical German and Japanese residential structures at Japanese Village and German Village, constructed at Dugway Proving Ground, Utah, in 1943. The M69 was the most successful incendiary in the tests.

Against Japan, the M69 was carried in the bomb bay of the Boeing B-29 Superfortress, with a typical load containing 40 cluster bombs, a total of 1,520 M69 bomblets. As they were very useful in China at Hankou, the bombs were very effective in setting fire to Japanese civilian structures in mass firebombing raids starting in February 1945 against Kobe. In the first ten days of March 1945, raids with the M69 and M47, extensive damage was done to Tokyo, to Nagoya, to Osaka, and to Kobe.

== See also ==
- Mark 77 bomb
