= Napalm =

Gelled incendiary mixture

North American F-100 Super Sabre dropping napalm in a training exercise

Napalm is an incendiary mixture of a gelling agent and a volatile petrochemical (usually gasoline or diesel fuel). The name is a portmanteau of two of the constituents of the original thickening and gelling agents: coprecipitated aluminium salts of naphthenic acid and palmitic acid. A team led by chemist Louis Fieser originally developed napalm for the US Chemical Warfare Service in 1942 in a secret laboratory at Harvard University. Of immediate first interest was its viability as an incendiary device to be used in American fire-bombing campaigns during World War II; its potential to be coherently projected into a solid stream that would carry for distance (instead of as a bloomy fireball of pure gasoline) resulted in widespread adoption in infantry and tank-/boat-mounted flamethrowers as well.

Napalm burns at temperatures ranging from 800 to 1,200 °C (1,500 to 2,200 °F). It burns longer than gasoline, is more easily dispersed, and adheres to its targets. These traits make it both effective and controversial. It has been widely used from the air and from the ground, the largest use having been via airdropped bombs in the incendiary attacks on Japanese cities during World War II. The U.S. military has used it for close air support roles in the Korean War, the Vietnam War, and various others. Napalm has also fueled most of the flamethrowers (tank-, ship-, and infantry-based) used since World War II, giving them much greater range. As a direct successor to napalm, the U.S. Armed Forces use Mark 77 bombs.

== Development ==
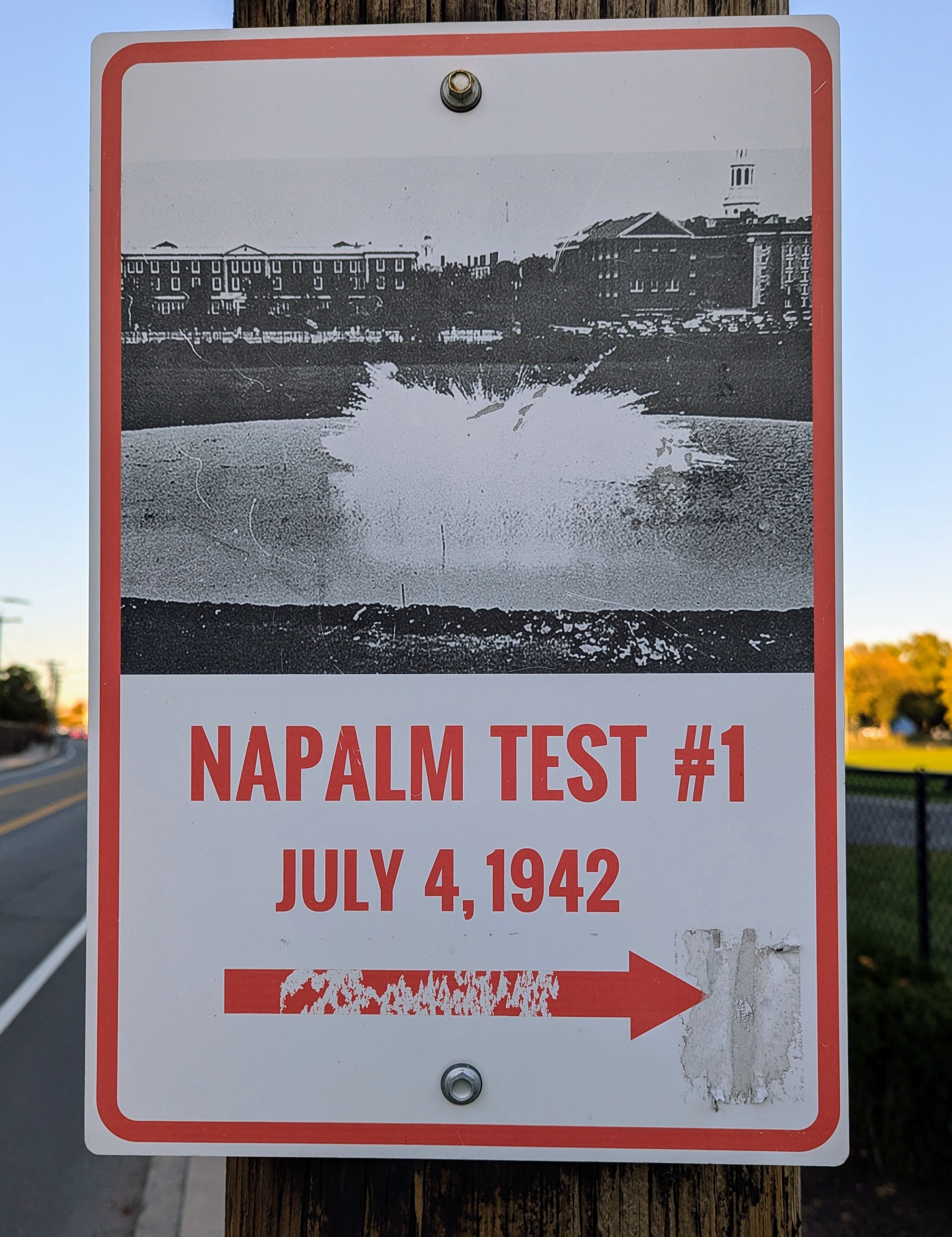
Sign memorializing the first test of napalm on July 4, 1942, near Harvard University's Ohiri Field in Boston, Massachusetts

The development of napalm was precipitated by the use of jellied gasoline mixtures by the Allied forces during World War II. Latex, used in these early forms of incendiary devices, became scarce, since natural rubber was almost impossible to obtain after the Japanese army captured the rubber plantations in Malaya, Indonesia, Vietnam and Thailand.

This shortage of natural rubber prompted chemists at US companies such as DuPont and Standard Oil of New Jersey, and researchers at Harvard University, to develop factory-made alternatives: artificial rubber for all uses, including vehicle tires, tank tracks, gaskets, hoses, medical supplies and rain clothing. A team of chemists led by Louis Fieser at Harvard University was the first to develop synthetic napalm, for the US Chemical Warfare Service in 1942. According to author Sven Lindqvist, "The production of napalm was first entrusted to Nuodex Products, and by the middle of April 1942 they had developed a brown, dry powder that was not sticky by itself, but when mixed with gasoline turned into an extremely sticky and flammable substance." One of Fieser's colleagues suggested adding phosphorus to the mix which increased the "ability to penetrate deeply [...] into the musculature, where it would continue to burn day after day."

On 4 July 1942, the first test occurred on the football field near the Harvard Business School. Tests under operational conditions were carried out at Jefferson Proving Ground on condemned farm buildings and subsequently at Dugway Proving Ground on buildings designed and constructed to represent those to be found in German and Japanese villages. This new mixture of chemicals was first approved for use on the front lines in 1943.

== Military use ==
=== World War II 1939–1945 ===
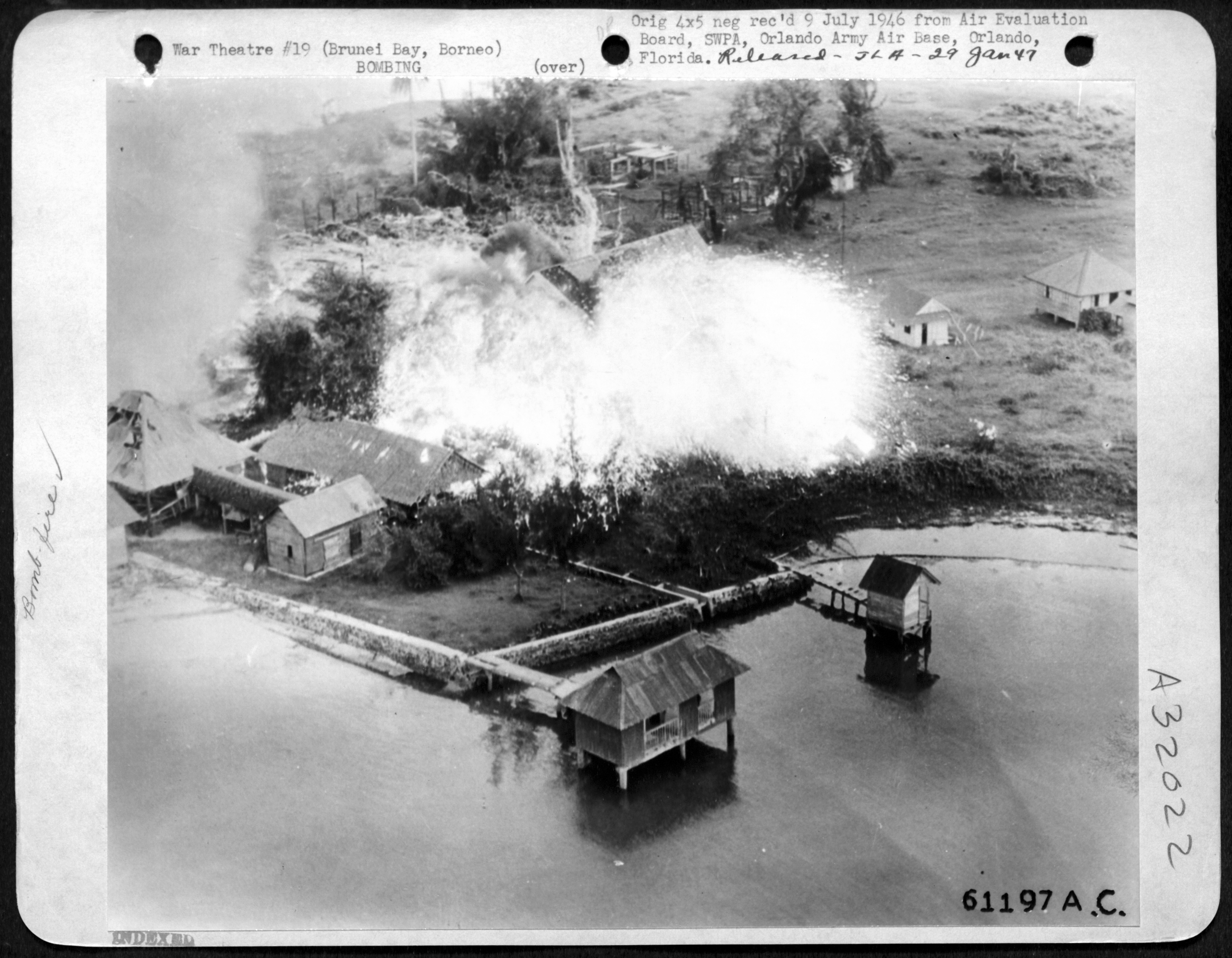
Results of a napalm strike by the United States Army Air Forces on a Japanese outpost off the coast of the island of Borneo

The first use of napalm in combat was in August 1943 during the Allied invasion of Sicily, when American troops using napalm-fueled flamethrowers burned down a wheat field where German forces were believed to be hiding. Napalm incendiary bombs were first used the following year, although the exact date and battle are disputed. (Note: Claimed dates including a 15 February air raid on Pohnpei, a 6 March air raid on Berlin, and an 18 July air raid on Tinian.)

Two-thirds of napalm bombs produced during World War II were used in the Pacific War. Napalm was often deployed against Japanese fortifications on Saipan, Iwo Jima, the Philippines, and Okinawa, where deeply dug-in Japanese troops refused to surrender. Following a shortage of conventional thermite bombs, general Curtis E. LeMay, among other high-ranking servicemen of the United States Army Air Forces, ordered air raids on Japan to start using napalm instead. A 1946 report by the National Defense Research Council claims that 40,000 tons of M69s were dropped on Japan throughout the war, damaging 64 cities and causing more deaths than the atomic bombings of Hiroshima and Nagasaki.

German fortifications and transportation hubs were targeted with napalm during both Operation Overlord and the Battle of the Bulge, sometimes in conjunction with artillery. During the Allied siege of La Rochelle, napalm was dropped on the outskirts of the Royan pocket, inadvertently killing French civilians.

The Royal Air Force (RAF) used napalm to a limited extent, in both the Pacific War and European Theatre of World War II.

=== Korean War 1950–1953 ===
Napalm was widely used by the United States during the Korean War. The US Air Force "dropped more than 30,000 tons of napalm on Korea."

"Oceans of [napalm] were dropped on Korea silently or without notice in America, with much more devastating effect, since the DPRK had many more populous cities and urban industrial installations than did Vietnam." The ground forces in South Korea holding defensive positions were often outnumbered by Chinese and North Koreans, but U.S. Air Force and Navy aviators had control of the air over nearly all of the Korean Peninsula. Hence, the American and other UN aviators used napalm for close air support of the ground troops. Napalm was used most notably at the beginning of the Battle of Outpost Harry.

Eighth Army chemical officer Donald Bode reported that, on an "average good day," UN Command pilots used 70,000 gallons (260,000 liters) of napalm, with approximately 60,000 gallons (230,000 liters) of this thrown by U.S. forces. The New York Herald Tribune hailed napalm, "the No. 1 Weapon in Korea." "Furthermore, the U.S. Air Force loved this infernal jelly, its 'wonder weapon,' as attested to by many articles in 'trade' journals of the time." While General Ridgway deplored the free-fire air zones he saw at times, he nonetheless wanted 1000-pound napalm bombs to be dropped from B-29 Superfortress heavy bombers in early 1951, in order to "wipe out all life in tactical locality and save the lives of our soldiers."

British Prime Minister Winston Churchill privately criticized the use of napalm in Korea, writing that it was "very cruel," as US and UN forces were "splashing it all over the civilian population" and "tortur[ing] great masses of people." He conveyed these sentiments to Chairman of the Joint Chiefs of Staff, General Omar Bradley. Publicly, however, Churchill allowed Bradley "to issue a statement that confirmed U.K. support for U.S. napalm attacks."

=== Vietnam War 1955–1975 ===
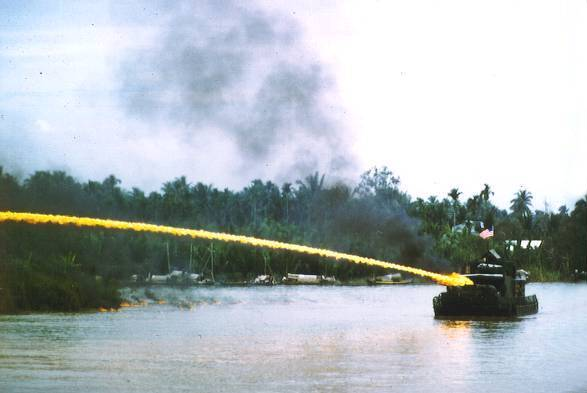
A "Zippo" riverboat of the US Brown-water navy firing an ignited napalm mixture from a riverboat-mounted flamethrower in Vietnam

Napalm became an intrinsic element of US military action during the Vietnam War as forces made increasing use of it for its tactical and psychological effects. Reportedly about 352,000 tonnes (388,000 short tons; 346,000 long tons) of US napalm bombs were dropped in the region between 1963 and 1973. The US Air Force and Navy used napalm with great effect against all kinds of targets, such as troops, tanks, buildings, jungles, and even railroad tunnels. The effect was not always purely physical as its destructive effects and ability to spread uncontrolled had psychological effects on Vietnamese forces and civilians as well.

=== Others ===
During the Greek Civil War, after the capture of Mount Vitsi during Operation Pyrsos, the Hellenic Air Force bombed Mount Grammos — a stronghold for the opposing Democratic Army of Greece — with US-supplied napalm.

The French Air Force regularly used napalm for close air support of ground operations in both the First Indochina War and the Algerian War. At first, the canisters were simply pushed out the cargo doors of transport planes, such as the Amiot AAC.1; later mostly B-26 bombers were used.

Peruvian forces employed napalm throughout the 1960s against both communist insurgents and the Matsés indigenous group; four prominent Matsés villages were bombed during the Matsés massacre in 1964.

From 1968 to 1978, Rhodesia produced a variant of napalm for use in the Rhodesian Bush War, nicknamed Frantan (short for "frangible tank"). Around the same time, its ally South Africa targeted guerrilla bases in Angola with napalm during the South African Border War.

In 1974, Turkey used napalm in both phases of the invasion of Cyprus. In 2018, Turkey was accused of using napalm in Operation Olive Branch against Kurdish nationalist groups.

== Antipersonnel effects ==
Phan Thi Kim Phuc, burned with napalm at the age of 9 during the Vietnam War (1972)

When used as a part of an incendiary weapon, napalm causes severe burns. Napalm burns at temperatures ranging from 800 to 1,200 °C (1,500 to 2,200 °F). One napalm firebomb released from a low-flying plane can damage an area of 2,500 square yards (2,100 m^{2}).

During combustion, napalm deoxygenates the available air and generates carbon monoxide and carbon dioxide, so asphyxiation, loss of consciousness and death are also possible. Napalm is lethal even for dug-in enemy personnel, as it flows into foxholes, tunnels, drainage and irrigation ditches, bunkers and other improvised troop shelters. Even people in undamaged shelters can be killed by hyperthermia, radiant heat, dehydration, asphyxiation, smoke exposure or carbon monoxide poisoning. Crews of armored fighting vehicles are also vulnerable, due to the intense heat conducted through the armor. Even in the case of a near miss, the heat can be enough to disable a vehicle.

Reporters in the Korean War, for example, saw "case after case of civilians drenched in napalm — the whole body 'covered with a hard, black crust sprinkled with yellow pus.'" In another instance, when Pfc. James Ransome, Jr.'s unit suffered a "friendly" hit of napalm: "his men rolled in the snow in agony ... as their skin burned to a crisp and peeled back 'like fried potato chips.'

== International law ==
International law has banned the use of napalm or other incendiary weapons against civilian populations and civilian areas in international armed conflicts under Protocol III of the Convention on Certain Conventional Weapons (CCW), which was adopted in 1980 and entered into force in December 1983. It does not, however, impose a total ban on their use, specifically against legitimate military targets.

As of January 2023, 126 countries have ratified Protocol III.

=== United States ===
The position of the United States on the prohibition of napalm by international convention is qualified. The U.S. did not ratify the convention prohibiting napalm until almost three decades after its adoption by the UN General Assembly. When the U.S. finally ratified the convention, "it made an express reservation of 'the right to use incendiary weapons against military objectives located in concentrations of civilians where it is judged that such use would cause fewer casualties and/or less collateral damage than alternative weapons." As a direct successor to napalm, the U.S. Armed Forces use Mark 77 bombs.

== See also ==
- Conventional weapon
- Incendiary weapon
- Carpet bombing
- Korean War
- Vietnam War
- Flame fougasse
- Triethylaluminium
- M69 incendiary – US Army Air Forces WWII incendiary bomblet
- Mark 77 bomb – American air-dropped incendiary bomb
- White phosphorus munition – Incendiary munition
- Molotov cocktail – Type of improvised incendiary weapon
- "Napalm Sticks to Kids" – Vietnam War-era song and cadence
- Greek fire – Byzantine incendiary weapon
