= Dragon drone =

Incendiary unmanned aerial vehicle

A dragon drone (Ukrainian: Дрон-дракон) also known as "Dracarys" is a type of incendiary unmanned aerial vehicle (UAV) initially developed and dubbed by Ukraine's Ministry of Defense and Ukrainian private defense manufacturers. The drone is used to spray molten thermite, at a temperature of around 2,000 °C (3,630 °F), at military targets in order to burn down natural barriers and fortifications that hold combatant military units. The device was created in 2024 during the Russo–Ukrainian war as a means to destroy forested areas and remove the cover of Russian soldiers. Their first documented use was in August–September 2024.

== Overview ==
A dragon drone is an unmanned combat aerial vehicle that can dispense thermite, a combination of powdered iron oxide and metal powder such as low-cost aluminum. Dragon drones typically have first-person view in a multirotor configuration allowing the operator to ignite the thermite above a military target and then at low altitude slowly move horizontally as the burning thermite is sprayed or drips out and onto the target.

Thermite can produce extreme heat exceeding 2,200 °C (3,990 °F) that can severely damage and burn through most materials, including flesh, wood and metal. As such, the dragon drone can destroy enemy personnel, their prepared positions and vehicles as well as armoured fighting vehicles left with their hatches open. It can also ignite the enemy's fuel, lubricants and ammunition or at least act as a defoliant to expose an enemy under foliage cover.

According to the Action on Armed Violence (AOAV), a British anti-war organization, exposure to lit thermite can lead to intensive and deep burns and damage to bones, while also potentially causing severe psychological trauma to the victims. In a report on incendiary weapons released in 2022, Human Rights Watch stated that thermite and similar weapons are "notorious for their horrific human cost," and can inflict fourth and fifth-degree burns that "cause damage to muscles, ligaments, tendons, nerves, blood vessels, and even bones", with treatment of survivors requiring constant care and months of recovery.

== Russo-Ukrainian war ==
=== Development ===
Some dragon drones are stated to be developed by the private Ukrainian weapons manufacturer Steel Hornets, who have said that they produce light weapons carrying thermite which they claim "can burn through 4 millimetres (0.16 in) of metal in under 10 seconds". While the United States Armed Forces manufacture thermite grenades, there is presently no evidence of the United States sending thermite-based weapons to Ukraine.

=== Ukrainian usage ===
Usage of dragon drones outside of directly targeting Russian forces and equipment includes assisting Ukrainian reconnaissance units by destroying forest foliage to expose enemy positions and equipment that can then be targeted with ground attacks or precision bombardment. Some military experts also stated that the fear and worry caused to Russian soldiers from the prospect of being horribly injured by molten thermite could cause more "psychological damage" to Russian forces than physical damage, and could significantly lower morale. Defense industry analyst and former officer in the British Army Nicholas Drummond called the use of the weapon "quite innovative". Ukrainian military sources while speaking to the Ukrainian newspaper Ukrainska Pravda stated that the primary use of the drones was to "destroy Russian infantry that has taken cover in strips of forest".

A post by the official Twitter/X account of Ukraine's Ministry of Defense included a video of the weapon being used in the Kharkiv region against Russian forces. Several other videos posted on Twitter/X by military bloggers showed their use against multiple Russian forest encampments. Ukraine's 60th Mechanized Brigade stated in a social media post that "Strike Drones are our wings of vengeance, bringing fire straight from the sky!" and that "When our 'Vidar' works – the Russian woman will never sleep," with Vidar referring to the Norse deity of vengeance.

=== Russian usage ===
In September 2024 Russian forces used their own dragon drones in their attack on Vuhledar.

=== Legality ===
While it is illegal to use thermite-grade weapons against civilians, it is not considered illegal under the Protocol on Incendiary Weapons to use them in military situations. It is also illegal for incendiary weapons to be used on populated areas or forested regions unless the foliage is expected to be covering military equipment. The United Nations Office for Disarmament Affairs generally discourages their use due to the difficulty of containing fires produced by their effects, which can cause significant and widespread environmental damage and civilian harm.

AOAV reported that Ukraine has used thermite-grade weaponry on opposing military forces, and stated that Russian units possibly used similar weaponry in Vuhledar on civilian areas in March 2023. Ukraine also asserted that Russia used "unspecified incendiary munitions" on civilian areas near Kharkiv and in Bakhmut.

== See also ==
- Use of incendiary weapons in the Russo-Ukrainian War
- Protocol on Incendiary Weapons
- Drone warfare
