= Bombing of Nagaoka =

- Part of the air raids on Japan during the Pacific War
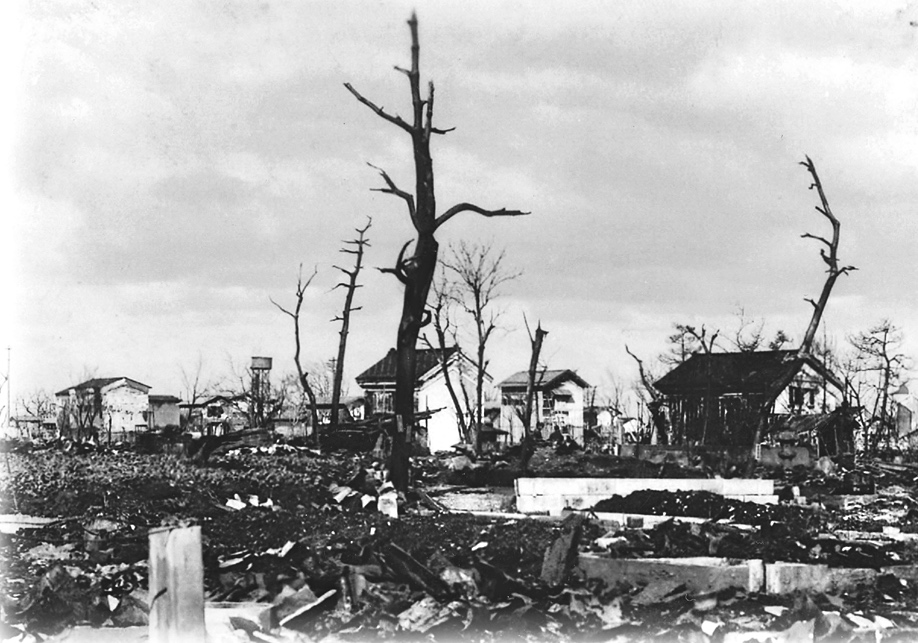
- Nagaoka after the 1 August 1945 air raid
Date	1 August 1945
Location	Nagaoka, Niigata
Result	Extensive damage to the city.

Belligerents
United States	Japan

Strength
125 heavy bombers	

Casualties and losses
None	1,486 killed 65.5 to 80 percent of the city destroyed

The bombing of Nagaoka (長岡空襲, Nagaoka kūshū) took place on the night of 1 August 1945, as part of the strategic bombing air raids on Japan campaign waged by the United States against military and civilian targets and population centers in the Japan home islands during the closing stages of the Pacific War in 1945. Between 65.5 and 80 percent of the urban area of Nagaoka was destroyed during the war.

== Background ==
Nagaoka was a regional commercial centre and home to one of the laboratories of Japan's Institute of Physical and Chemical Research. As of 1945 it had a population of around 67,000. While local lore held that Nagaoka was targeted because it was the hometown of Japanese Admiral Isoroku Yamamoto, who had directed the attack on Pearl Harbor, the presence of the chemical laboratory was more likely the reason the city was targeted.

== Air raids ==
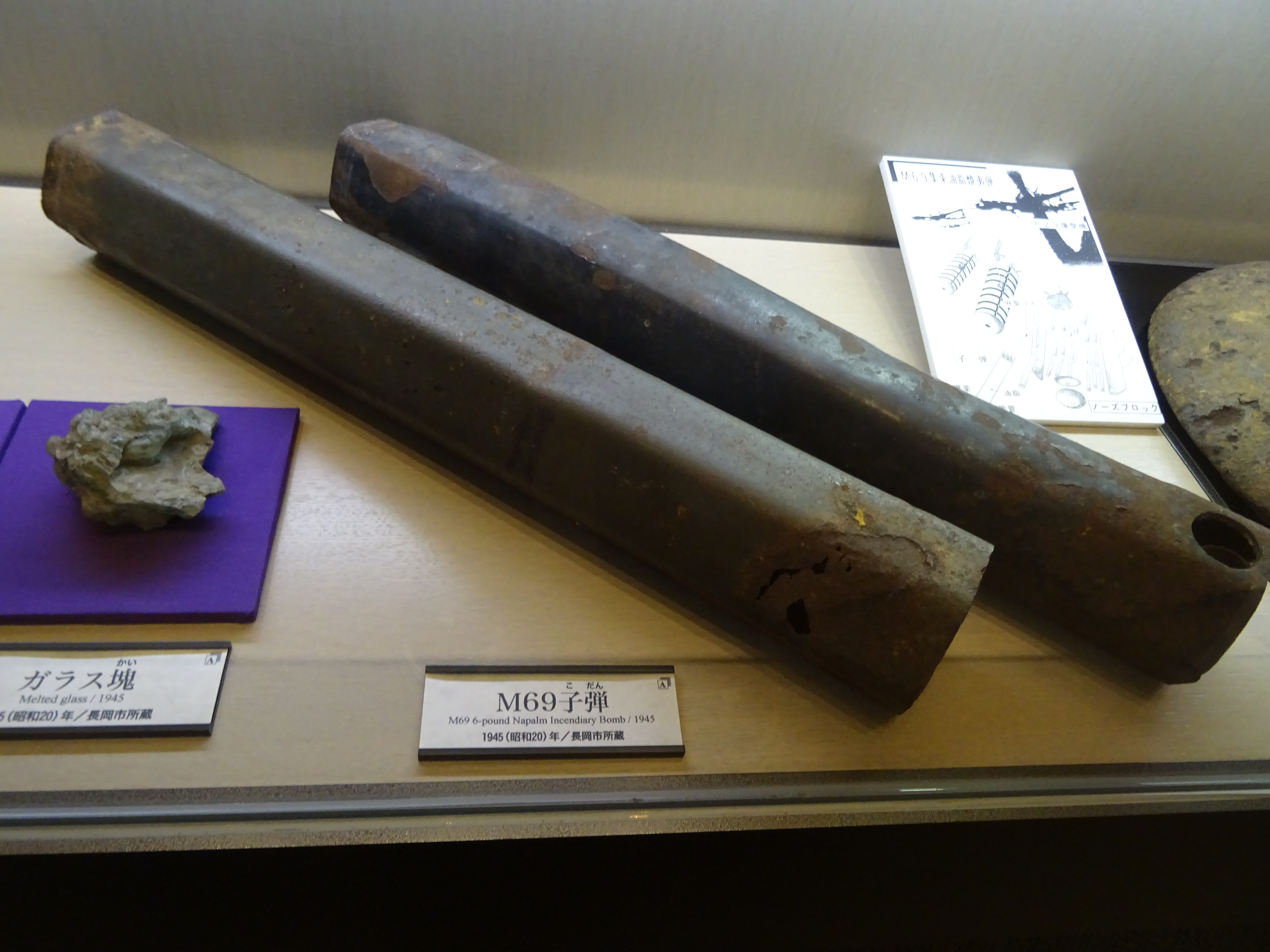
M-69 napalm incendiary bomb, that were used in bombing of Nagaoka in 1945. Exhibit at Niigata Prefectural Museum of History.

Nagaoka was attacked for the first time on 26 July 1945. The city was one of ten to be attacked during late July by the United States Army Air Forces' 509th Composite Group to practice the tactics the unit later used to conduct the atomic bombings of Hiroshima and Nagasaki. These raids were conducted by small groups of two to six Boeing B-29 Superfortress bombers armed with Pumpkin bombs. The 509th Composite Group assessed the results of the small attack on Nagaoka as having been "fair".

During the night of 27/28 July B-29s dropped leaflets on Nagaoka and ten other cities which stated that they would be subjected to attack, and that civilians should evacuate ahead of the raids. This tactic sought to intensify the psychological effects of the bombing campaign.

The main raid on Nagaoka occurred on 1 August 1945. Commencing at around 10:30 p.m. that night, 125 B-29 Superfortress bombers from the 313th Bombardment Wing struck the city with an estimated 163,000 incendiary bombs totaling 925 tons. The raid lasted for 1 hour and 40 minutes. The city suffered severe damage, though estimates of its extent vary: in 1953 the USAAF's official history stated that 65.5 percent of Nagaoka's urban area was destroyed, and this figure was also used by historian Richard B. Frank in 2001. However, in 2016 The Washington Post reported that 80 percent of Nagaoka had been burnt out. A total of 1,486 people were killed in Nagaoka, including more than 280 school age children. The American force that attacked Nagaoka did not suffer any casualties.

The cities of Toyama, Mito and Hachioki were also attacked on the night of 1/2 August, and suffered severe damage. The New York Times reported that the raids that night had included the largest number of bombs dropped up to that time.

== Legacy ==
In November 1951 a bronze statue was erected at the Nagaoka railway station to commemorate the bombing and its victims. Called Heiwa-zo (Statue of Peace), it depicts a goddess with outstretched arms, a little girl with a ball, and a boy reading a book. Hidden in the bosom of the goddess is a copper plate engraved with the names of the schoolchildren who died in the air raid. The statue was moved to the Peace Forest Memorial Park in 1996.

Beginning in 2003, a fireworks display has been held annually on 1 August at 10:30 pm, the time the bombing occurred. Three shiragiku (white chrysanthemum fireworks) are launched "as an offering to the war dead". In 2015 the display featured an additional 2,000 fireworks.

== See also ==
- Evacuations of civilians in Japan during World War II
- Grave of the Fireflies (short story), a semi-autobiographical short story set during the bombing
  - Grave of the Fireflies, an anime film based on the novel
