= M69 =

M69 or M-69 may refer to:

- M69 motorway, a motorway in England between Coventry City and Leicester City
  - M69 derby, a football match played between Coventry City and Leicester City
- M-69 (Michigan highway), a state highway in Michigan
- Marine Highway 69, a designation of the Gulf Intracoastal Waterway which runs along the Texas coastline
- Miles M.69 Marathon, an aircraft
- Messier 69, a globular cluster in the constellation Sagittarius
- M69 Grenade A training grenade
- M-69 Incendiary cluster bomb
- M69 mortar, medium weight mortar
- M/69, service uniform of the Royal Danish Army
