= Use of incendiary weapons in the Russo-Ukrainian war =

Incendiary weapons were used a number of times during the Russo-Ukrainian War. Russians were accused of using white phosphorus bombs multiple times; in the Battle of Kyiv and against Kramatorsk in March 2022, against dug-in defenders at the Azovstal steel plant in Mariupol in May 2022, and in Marinka over the 2022 Christmas holiday. White phosphorus is a toxic chemical, and exposure to vapors leads to long-term ailments of the body, up to permanent disfigurement and death through organ failure.

The use of incendiary weapons in civilian areas violates Article 2 of the 1980 Protocol on Incendiary Weapons, which prohibits only the use of air-delivered incendiary bombs in the close vicinity of concentrations of civilians and deliberate attacks against civilians with incendiary weapons (deliberate attacks on civilians are prohibited regardless of the type of weapon used). The 1949 Geneva Conventions do not regulate the use of incendiary weapons. Additionally, Protocol I. prohibits the indiscriminate use of any weapons, not only incendiary. Both Russia and Ukraine are signatories of the 1980 Protocol on Incendiary Weapons, the former ratified it on June 10, 1982, while the latter did so on June 23, 1982.

== Types of munitions ==
Independent experts interviewed by the media stated at the end of March 2022 that there was a lack of data to unequivocally establish the type of incendiary weapons used, and some suspected some incendiary effects were produced by the 9M22S thermite incendiary submunitions fired by the Grad MLRS, which were developed by the Soviets "to discover the minimum size fragment of incendiary mix" to annihilate the enemy: "all it takes is about 5 grams – [they] developed [the 9M22S] cluster warhead to distribute these [submunitions]... Each 9N510 submunition consists of a hexagonal shell of magnesium alloy filled with a fire mixture whose main ingredients are gasoline, isopropyl nitrate and rubber... The magnesium burns briefly with a bright white light... and typically sticks to the target while burning. Attempting to scrape the mix off just spreads it, and it is not extinguished by water." A Russian observer of the Battle of Azovstal, who also blamed the 9M22S-9N510 due to its colour, lent credence to this interpretation.

== During the War in the Donbas ==
The use of incendiary weapons in the Russo-Ukrainian War was first remarked in Sloviansk in June 2014; followed late July 2014 around eastern Ukraine, then in August at Ilovaisk, and between Oleksandrivka and Chumaky in November, going on to include battlegrounds of the war in Donbas (2014–2022).

== During the Russian invasion ==
Russian incendiary munitions being used against Ukrainian positions on the Bakhmut front in October 2023. The State Border Guard Service of Ukraine initially reported these munitions as white phosphorus.

On 15 March 2022, when the incendiaries were used in Battle of Mariupol Serhiy Haidai, the Governor of Luhansk Oblast, called the Russian attackers war criminals, comparing their actions to those of the Nazis. Similar munitions were seen in Popasna two days earlier. On March 25, 2022, in an address to NATO leaders, President of Ukraine Volodymyr Zelenskyy accused the Russian military of using phosphorus shells against civilians: "This morning, by the way, phosphorus bombs were used. Russian phosphorus bombs. Adults were killed again, children were killed again". At the end of the month, the deputy head of the Kyiv police reported about the shelling of Kramatorsk with incendiary shells with phosphorus. And in the media there were photos showing characteristic flashes over Kyiv. Although at that time the use of phosphorus shells was not confirmed by independent organizations, experts admitted such a possibility. The active Ukrainian resistance and the poor progress of the offensive may have prompted the Russian authorities to use "dangerous weapons". At the same time, Russian Ministry of Defense claimed that the armed forces of Ukraine used phosphorus ammunition in the defense of the Hostomel airfield at the end of February.

Deputy Defense Minister of Ukraine Anna Malyar said in April 2022 that the government has begun checking on incoming information about the possible use of chemical weapons, particularly phosphorus bombs, during the blockade of Mariupol. The head of the administration of the Donetsk region and Ukrainian politician Pavlo Kirilenko confirmed that he had seen reports that an unknown explosive device was dropped by a drone in the vicinity of the Mariupol metallurgical plant, three people felt ill and were hospitalized. Russian-backed DPR forces have denied the use of banned weapons in Mariupol.

In mid-May, Ombudsman for Human Rights in Ukraine Lyudmila Denisova accused Russian forces of attacking the Mariupol metallurgical plant, Azovstal, with incendiary and phosphorus bombs. This was confirmed by a video with characteristic flashes over the territory of the plant, which was posted on social networks by the commander of the pro-Russian self-proclaimed Donetsk Republic Alexander Khodakovsky, clearly depicting the 9M22S thermite-containing incendiary submunitions. At that time, a number of civilians who had previously taken refuge at the plant were evacuated with the support of the International Committee of the Red Cross and the UN.

Western experts disagreed on whether Azovstal was shelled with phosphorus ammunition or thermite magnesium ammunition. The Russian command did not comment on which weapon was used for the attack. The Russian media suggested that the Azovstal video showed Grad projectiles, and not phosphorus bombs.

Defence View and Forbes explain that the Russians probably used 9M22S incendiary shells developed by NPO Splav during the Soviet era. Instead of a high-explosive fragmentation warhead, the 9M22S rocket carries a warhead containing 180 separate 9N510 incendiary elements. Designed to ignite vegetation, storage facilities, or fuel, these incendiary elements consist of hexagonal prisms made from a magnesium alloy known to the Russian GOST as ML-5, filled with a thermite mixture. Each element has a nominal length of 40 mm and a width of 25 mm and a burning time of at least 2 minutes. It is also noted that the effect of these incendiary, as well as conventional lighting munitions (especially at night), outwardly resembles the use of phosphorus munitions.

On 13 March 2023, footage of a hail of thermite munitions raining down on a residential area during the Battle of Vuhledar was released.

From 5–7 May 2023, some videos that were filmed at night were shown on the networks where attacks with incendiary weapons by the Russians could be seen in the Battle of Bakhmut.

Beginning in August–September 2024, Ukraine began the use of "dragon drones" that could spray molten thermite over Russian positions in forests to remove foliage and expose encampments and military equipment that could either ignite or be targeted by later attacks or precise bombings.

== See also ==
- War crimes in the Russian invasion of Ukraine
- Use of cluster bombs in the Russian invasion of Ukraine
