= Firebombing =

Bombing technique

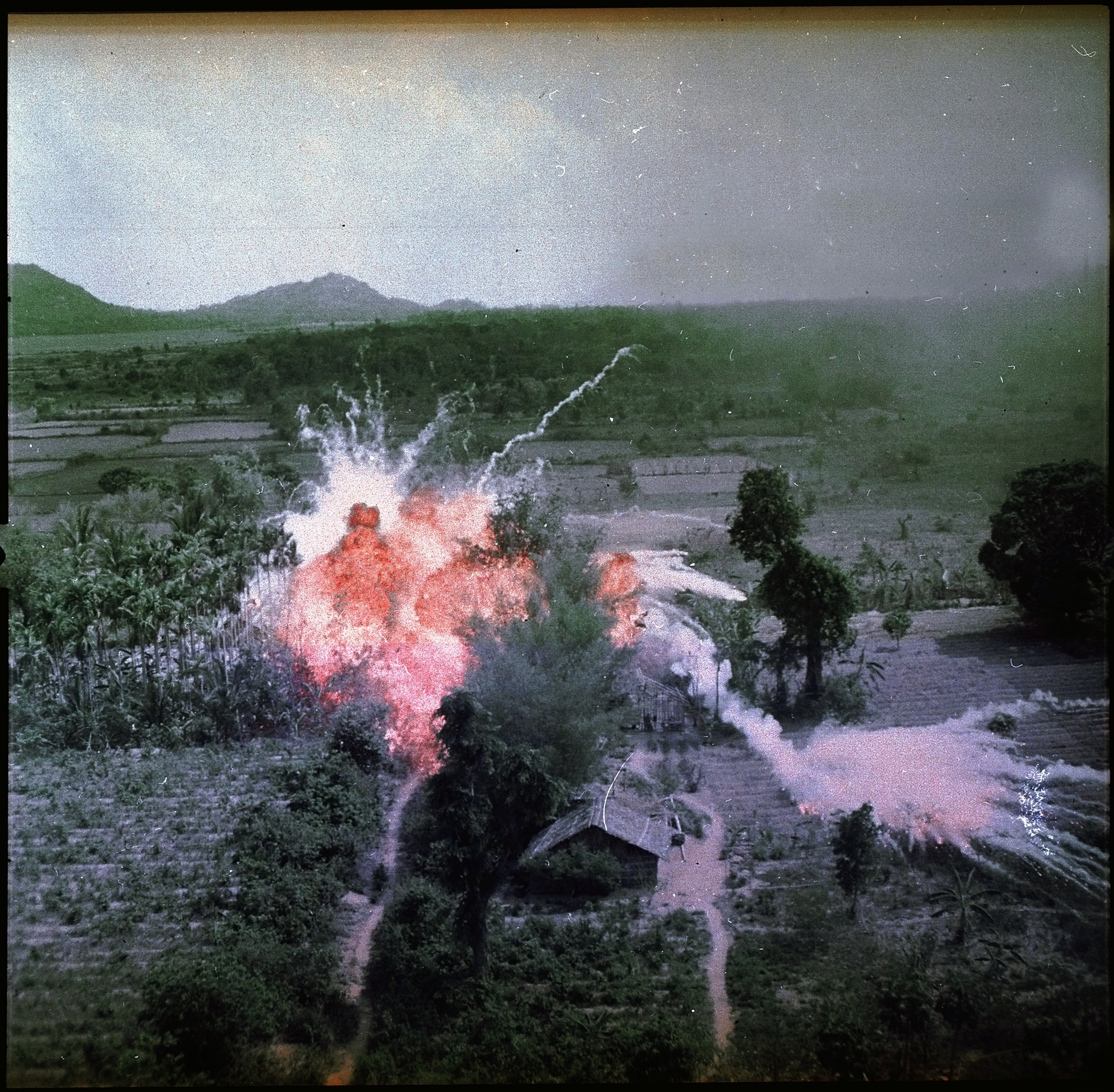
An American aircraft drops napalm on Viet Cong positions in 1965.

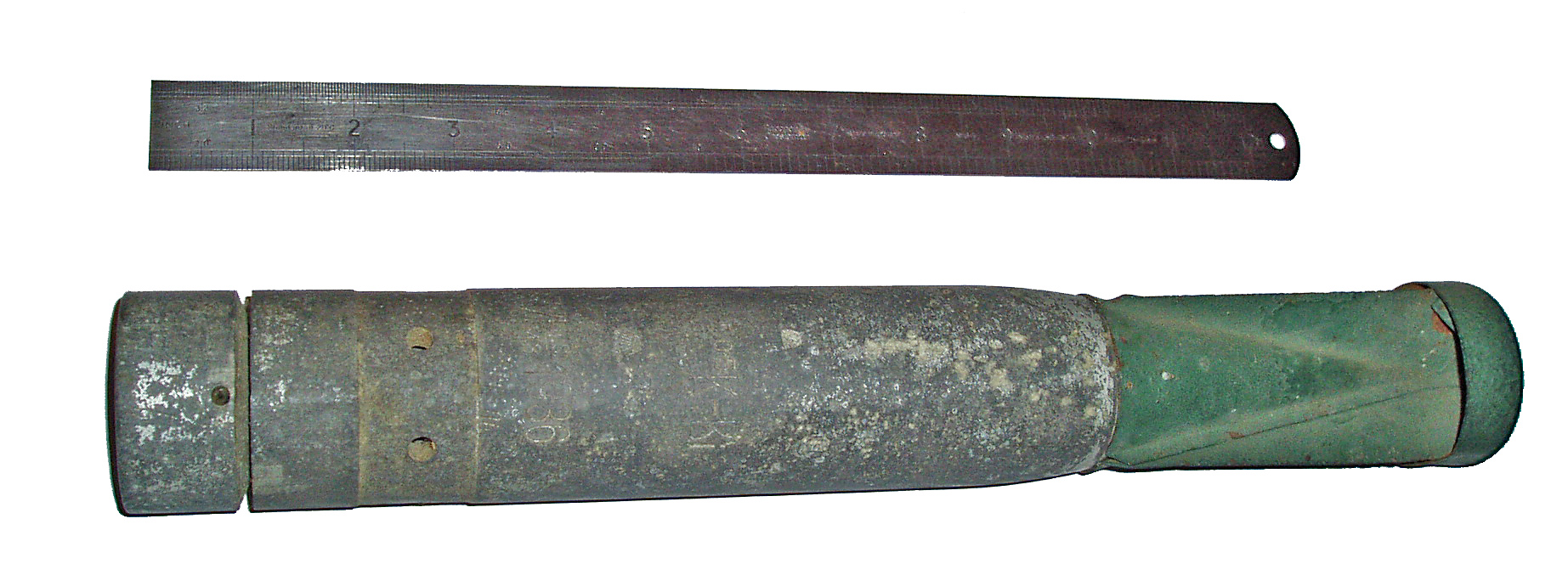
A German World War II incendiary bomb remnant

Firebombing is an aerial bombing technique designed to damage a target, generally an urban area, through the use of fire, caused by incendiary devices, rather than from the blast effect of large bombs. In popular usage, any act in which an incendiary device is used to initiate a fire is often described as a "firebombing".

Although simple incendiary bombs have been used to destroy buildings since the start of gunpowder warfare, World War I saw the first use of strategic bombing from the air to damage the morale and economy of the enemy, such as the German Zeppelin air raids conducted on London. The Chinese wartime capital of Chongqing was firebombed by the Imperial Japanese starting in early 1939 during the Second Sino-Japanese War. London, Coventry, and many other British cities were firebombed during the Blitz by Nazi Germany. Most large German cities were extensively firebombed starting in 1942, and almost all large Japanese cities were firebombed during the last six months of World War II.

This technique makes use of small incendiary bombs possibly delivered by a cluster bomb, such as the Molotov bread basket. If a fire catches, it can spread, taking in adjacent buildings that would have been largely unaffected by a high explosive bomb. Thus, a planeload of firebombs may do more damage than a planeload of high explosive bombs could, making them more effective by weight.

The use of incendiaries alone does not generally start uncontrollable fires where the targets are roofed with nonflammable materials such as tiles or slates. The use of a combination of bombers carrying high explosive bombs, such as the British blockbuster bombs, which blew out windows and roofs and exposed the interiors of buildings, and others following carrying incendiary bombs is much more effective. Alternatively, a preliminary bombing with conventional bombs can be followed by subsequent attacks by incendiary carrying bombers. In Japan, where the buildings were traditionally made of wood, firebombing created vast infernos that burned entire cities to the ground.

== Tactics ==
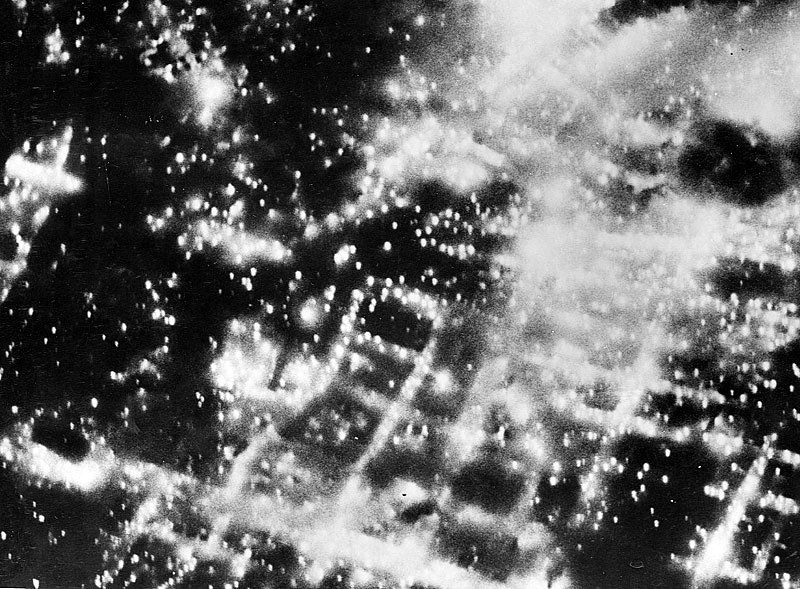
Firebombing in Braunschweig, Germany, 15 October 1944

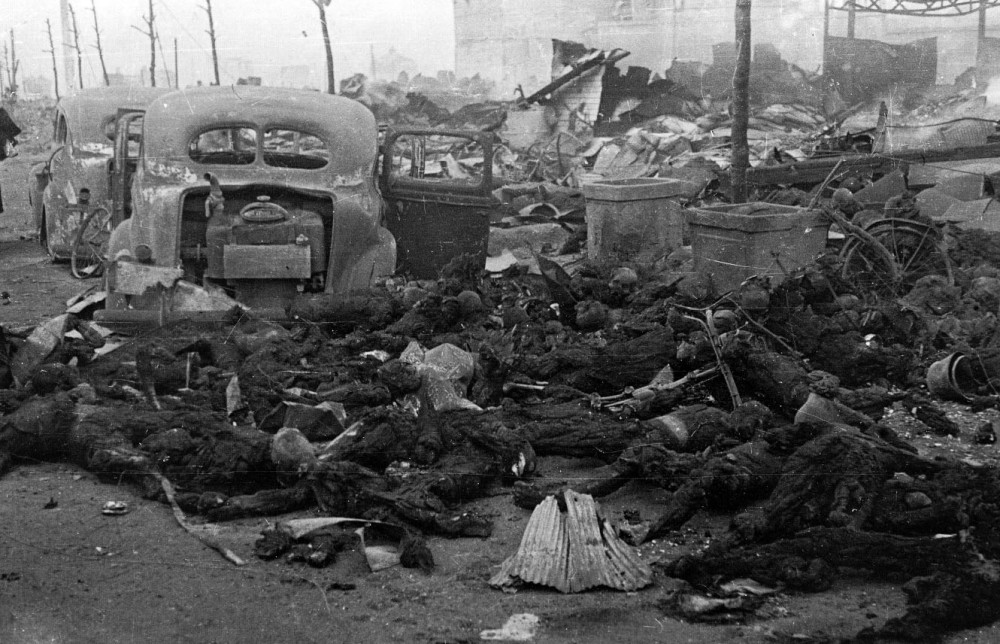
Charred remains of Japanese civilians after the bombing of Tokyo

Early in World War II many British cities were firebombed. Two particularly notable raids were the Coventry Blitz on 14 November 1940, and the blitz on London on the night of 29 December/30 December 1940, which was the most destructive raid on London during the war with much of the destruction caused by fires started by incendiary bombs. During the Coventry Blitz the Germans pioneered several innovations which were to influence all future strategic bomber raids during the war. These were: the use of pathfinder aircraft with electronic aids to navigate, to mark the targets before the main bomber raid; and the use of high explosive bombs and air-mines coupled with thousands of incendiary bombs intended to set the city ablaze. The first wave of follow-up bombers dropped high explosive bombs, the intent of which was to knock out the utilities (the water supply, electricity network and gas mains), and to crater the road — making it difficult for the fire engines to reach fires started by the successive waves of bombers. The follow-up waves dropped a combination of high explosive and incendiary bombs. There were two types of incendiary bombs: those made of magnesium and iron powders, and those made of petroleum. The high-explosive bombs and the larger air-mines were not only designed to hamper the Coventry fire brigade, they were also intended to damage roofs, making it easier for the incendiary bombs to fall into buildings and ignite them. As Sir Arthur Harris, commander of RAF Bomber Command, wrote after the war:

In the early days of bombing our notion, like that of the Germans, was to spread an attack out over the whole night, thereby wearing down the morale of the civilian population. The result was, of course, that an efficient fire brigade could tackle a single load of incendiaries, put them out, and wait in comfort for the next to come along; they might also be able to take shelter when a few high explosives bombs were dropping. ... But it was observed that when the Germans did get an effective concentration, ... then our fire brigades had a hard time; if a rain of incendiaries is mixed with high explosives bombs there is a temptation for the fireman to keep his head down. The Germans, again and again, missed their chance, as they did during the London blitz that I watched from the roof of the Air Ministry, of setting our cities ablaze by a concentrated attack. Coventry was adequately concentrated in point of space, but all the same, there was little concentration in point of time, and nothing like the fire tornadoes of Hamburg or Dresden ever occurred in this country. But they did do us enough damage to teach us the principle of concentration, the principle of starting so many fires at the same time that no firefighting services, however efficiently and quickly they were reinforced by the fire brigades of other towns could get them under control.

— Arthur Harris

The tactical innovation of the bomber stream was developed by the RAF to overwhelm the German aerial defenses of the Kammhuber Line during World War II to increase the RAF's concentration in time over the target. But after the lessons learned during the Blitz, the tactic of dropping a high concentration of bombs over the target in the shortest time possible became standard in the RAF as it was more effective than a longer raid. For example, during the Coventry Blitz on the night of 14/15 November 1940, 515 Luftwaffe bombers, many flying more than one sortie against Coventry, delivered their bombs over a period of time lasting more than 10 hours. In contrast, the much more devastating raid on Dresden on the night of 13/14 of February 1945 by two waves of the RAF Bomber Command's main force, involved their bombs being released at 22:14, with all but one of the 254 Lancaster bombers releasing their bombs within two minutes, and the last one released at 22:22. The second wave of 529 Lancasters dropped all of their bombs between 01:21 and 01:45. This means that in the first raid, on average, one Lancaster dropped a full load of bombs every half a second and in the second larger raid that involved more than one RAF bomber Group, one every three seconds.

The United States Army Air Forces (USAAF) officially only bombed precision targets over Europe, but for example, when 316 B-17 Flying Fortresses bombed Dresden in a follow-up raid at around noon on 14 February 1945, because of clouds the later waves bombed using H2X radar for targeting. The mix of bombs to be used on the Dresden raid was about 40% incendiaries, much closer to the RAF city-busting mix than the bomb-load usually used by the Americans in precision bombardments. (Note: Taylor compares this 40% mix with the raid on Berlin on 3 February where the ratio was 10% incendiaries.) This was quite a common mix when the USAAF anticipated cloudy conditions over the target.

In its attacks on Japan, the USAAF abandoned its precision bombing method that was used in Europe before and adopted a policy of saturation bombing, using incendiaries to burn Japanese-held cities including Wuhan, and the cities of the Japanese home islands. These tactics were used to devastating effect with many urban areas burned out. The first incendiary raid by B-29 Superfortress bombers was against Kobe on 4 February 1945, with 69 B-29s arriving over the city at an altitude of 24,500 to 27,000 ft (7,500 to 8,200 m), dropping 152 tons of incendiaries and 14 tons of fragmentation bombs to destroy about 57.4 acres (23.2 ha). The next mission was another high altitude daylight incendiary raid against Tokyo on 25 February when 172 B-29s destroyed around 643 acres (260 ha) of the snow-covered city, dropping 453.7 tons of mostly incendiaries with some fragmentation bombs. Changing to low-altitude night tactics to concentrate the fire damage while minimizing the effectiveness of fighter and artillery defenses, the Operation Meetinghouse raid carried out by 279 B-29s raided Tokyo again on the night of 9/10 March, dropped 1,665 tons of incendiaries from altitudes of 5,000 to 9,000 ft (1,500 to 2,700 m), mostly using the 500-pound (230 kg) E-46 cluster bomb which released 38 M-69 oil-based incendiary bombs at an altitude of 2,500 ft (760 m). A lesser number of M-47 incendiaries was dropped: the M-47 was a 100-pound (45 kg) jelled-gasoline and white phosphorus bomb which ignited upon impact.

In the first two hours of the raid, 226 of the attacking aircraft or 81% unloaded their bombs to overwhelm the city's fire defenses. The first to arrive dropped bombs in a large X pattern centered in Tokyo's working class district near the docks; later aircraft simply aimed near this flaming X. Approximately 15.8 square miles (4,090 ha) of the city were destroyed and 100,000 people are estimated to have died in the resulting conflagration, more than the immediate deaths of either the atomic bombings of Hiroshima or Nagasaki. After this raid, the USAAF continued with low-altitude incendiary raids against Japan's cities, destroying an average of 40% of the built-up area of 64 of the largest cities.

== Legality and ethics ==
Prior to 1980, when Protocol III of the UN Convention on Conventional Weapons was signed, international law did not directly address incendiary weapons. Signatory states to Protocol III are bound by which governs the use of incendiary weapons:

- prohibits the use of incendiary weapons against civilians (effectively a reaffirmation of the general prohibition on attacks against civilians in Additional Protocol I to the Geneva Conventions)
- prohibits the use of air-delivered incendiary weapons against military targets located within concentrations of civilians and loosely regulates the use of other types of incendiary weapons in such circumstances.

== In popular culture ==
- The 1967 semi-autobiographical short story Grave of the Fireflies follows events after the firebombing of Kobe. It was eventually adapted into a 1988 film of the same name.
- The middle portion of historical fantasy novel Teito Monogatari, is set during the period of the Allied firebombings in Japan. This section of the novel was eventually adapted into the film Tokyo: The Last War.
- Kurt Vonnegut's science fiction novel Slaughterhouse-Five is partially based on his personal experience of the Dresden firestorm.
- The novel Extremely Loud and Incredibly Close by Jonathan Safran Foer contains narrative threads dealing with the Bombing of Dresden.

== See also ==
- German Village (Dugway proving ground)
- Japanese Village (Dugway Proving Ground)
- General Curtis E. LeMay, USAF
- Bombing of Hamburg in World War II
- Bombing of London in World War II
- Bombing of Frampol in World War II
- Bombing of Warsaw in World War II
- Bombing of Wieluń
- Bombing of Tokyo
- Aerial bombing of cities
- Roerich Pact

== Sources ==
- Bradley, F.J. (1999). No Strategic Targets Left. Paducah, Kentucky: Turner Publishing. pp. 33–35. ISBN 9781563114830.
- Davis, Richard G. (2006). Arbush, Carole (ed.). Bombing the European Axis Powers : A Historical Digest of the Combined Bomber Offensive, 1939–1945 (PDF). Maxwell Air Force Base, Alabama: Air University Press (published April 2006). Archived from the original (PDF) on 2007-06-16.
- Harris, Arthur (2005). Bomber Offensive. Pen & sword military classics. Barnsley: Pen & Sword Books Limited. ISBN 978-1-84415-210-0.
- Taylor, Fred (2005). Dresden: Tuesday 13 February 1945 (1st ed.). London: Bloomsbury. ISBN 978-0-7475-7084-4.
- Craven, Wesley Frank; Cate, James Lea, eds. (1983). The Army Air Forces in World War II: January 1939 to August 1942. Vol. 7. Washington, D.C: U.S. Government Printing Office. ISBN 978-0-912799-03-2.
