= Japanese Village (Dugway Proving Ground) =

Range of mock houses in Utah, US

Coordinates: 40.139062°N 113.006425°W

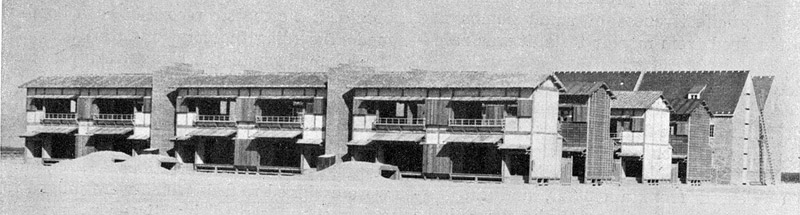
Japanese village 1943, German village in background

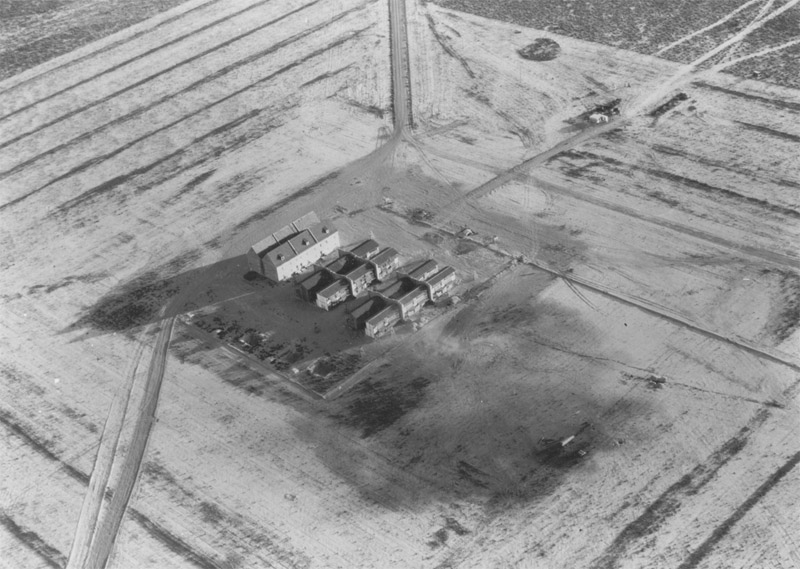
German and Japanese village, aerial view, 1943

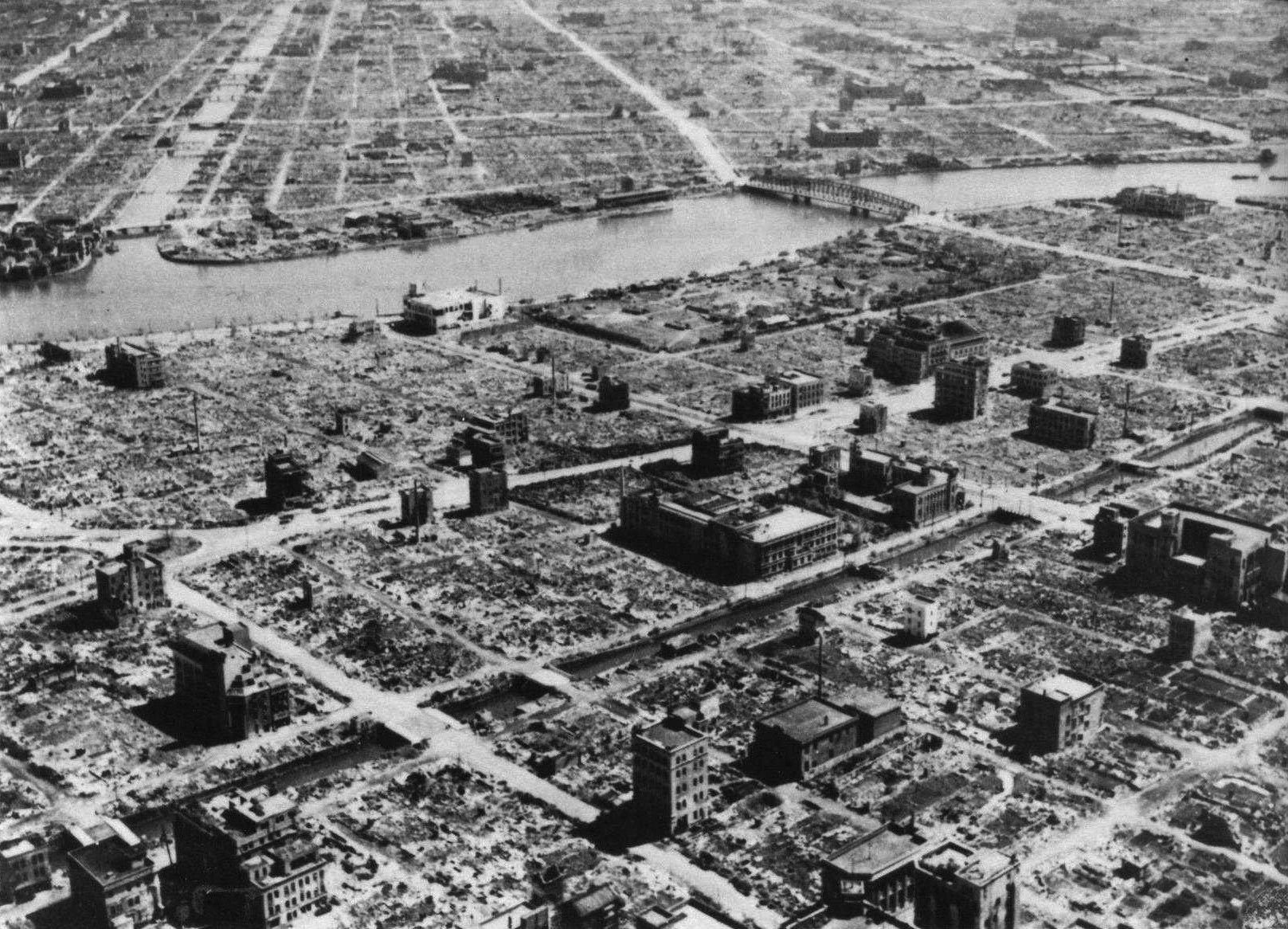
Tokyo after the massive Operation Meetinghouse firebombing attack on the night of March 9–10, 1945, the single most destructive raid in military aviation history.

Japanese Village was the nickname for a range of houses constructed in 1943 by the U.S. Army in the Dugway Proving Ground in Utah, roughly 100 kilometers (62 mi) southwest of Salt Lake City.

== History ==
Dugway was a high-security testing facility for chemical and biological weapons. The purpose of the replicas of Japanese homes, which were repeatedly rebuilt after being intentionally burned down, was to perfect the use of incendiary bombing tactics, the fire bombing of Japanese cities during World War II.

Testing on the Japanese Village at Dugway Proving Ground coincided with the erosion of precision bombing practice in the U.S. Army Air Force and validated civilians as targets of air warfare during World War II. As such, the interiors of Japanese Village contained furnishing (including tables, futon, radios, chests, hibachi stoves, etc.) as found in contemporaneous Japanese housing.

The principal architect for Japanese village was Antonin Raymond who had spent many years building in Japan. Boris Laiming, who had studied fires in Japan, writing a report on the 1923 Tokyo fire, also contributed.

The most successful bomb to come out of the May–September 1943 tests against the mock-up Japanese homes was the napalm-filled M-69 Incendiary cluster bomb. Contenders had been the M-47 (containing coconut oil, rubber, and gasoline) and the M-50 (a blend of magnesium and powdered aluminum and iron oxide). Also tested was the "Bat bomb" a lightweight "bat incendiary" that was attached to live bats.

For the tests B-17 and B-24 bombers were used operating at normal bombing altitude, and the effects on the villages were meticulously recorded.

== Popular culture ==
The novel The Gods of Heavenly Punishment by Jennifer Cody Epstein contains a fictionalized account of the building and destruction of the Japanese Village.

== See also ==
- German Village
- Strategic bombing during World War II
