= Dugway Proving Ground =

US Army facility in Tooele County, Utah

- Tooele County, Utah in the United States
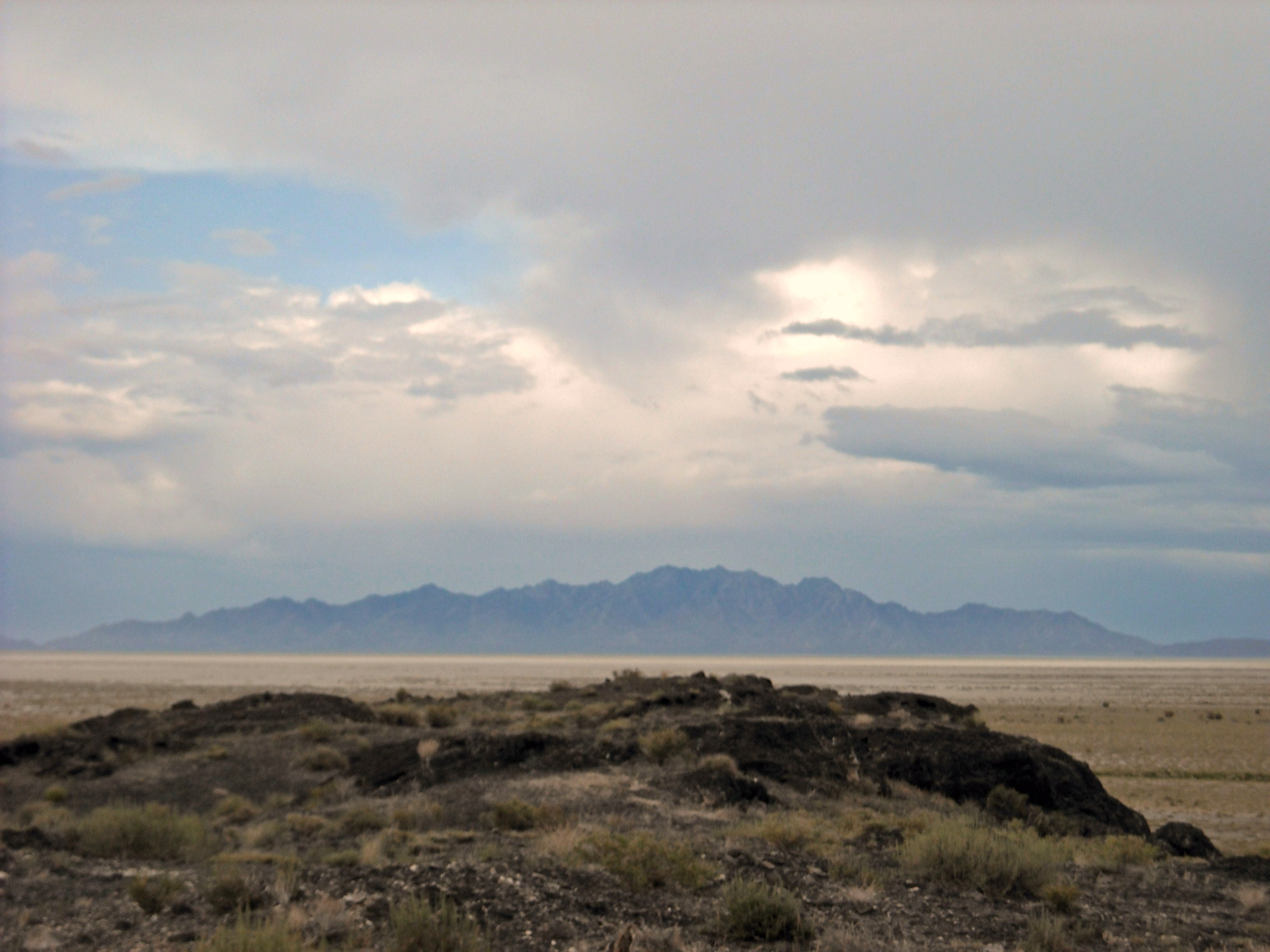
- Dugway Proving Ground encompasses a vast area of the western Utah desert

Site information
- Type: Military test center
- Owner: Department of Defense
- Operator: United States
- Controlled by: United States Army Test and Evaluation Command
- Condition: Operational
- Website: Official website

Location
- Location in the United States
- Coordinates: 40°13′15″N 112°44′39″W

Site history
- Built: 1942
- In use: 1942 – present
- Events: Dugway sheep incident (1968)

Garrison information
- Current commander: Colonel Brian A. Sansom

Dugway Proving Ground (DPG) is a United States Army facility established in 1942 to test biological and chemical weapons, located about 85 miles (137 km) southwest of Salt Lake City, Utah, and 13 miles (21 km) south of the 2,624-square-mile (6,800 km^{2}) Utah Test and Training Range.

== Location ==
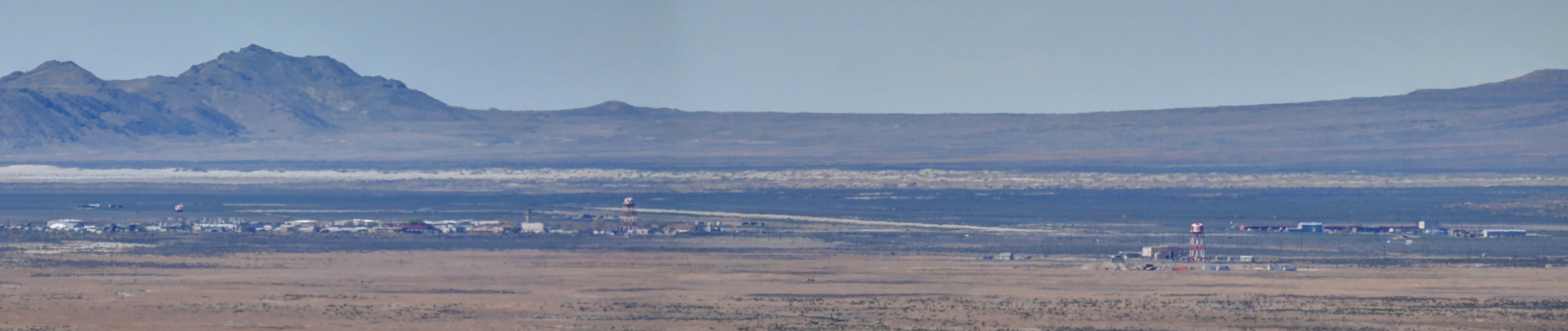
Dugway Proving Ground as seen from Simpson Springs Campground

Dugway Proving Ground is located about 85 mi (137 km) southwest of Salt Lake City, Utah, in southern Tooele County and just north of Juab County. It encompasses 801,505 acres (1,252.352 sq mi; 3,243.58 km^{2}) of the Great Salt Lake Desert, an area the size of the state of Rhode Island, and is surrounded on three sides by mountain ranges. It had a resident population of 342 as of the 2020 United States census, all of whom lived in the community of Dugway, Utah, at its extreme eastern end.

It is 13 mi (21 km) south of the 2,624 sq mi (6,796 km^{2}) Utah Test and Training Range and together they form the largest block of overland contiguous special use airspace measured from surface or near surface within the continental U.S. (207 by 122 mi (333 by 196 km)).

The transcontinental Lincoln Highway passed through the present site of the Dugway Proving Ground, and is the only section of the old highway closed to the public. At least one old wooden bridge over a creek still stands. The name Dugway comes from a technique of digging a trench into a hillside to create a flat surface along which a wagon can travel.

== Mission ==
Dugway's mission is to test United States and Allied biological and chemical weapon defense systems in a secure and isolated environment. In addition to chem/bio defense testing and evaluation, Dugway supports training for joint, multinational military organizations and first responders, testing and evaluation of obscurants, and the development, testing, and integration of unmanned aircraft systems, missiles and more. DPG also serves as a facility for US Army Reserve and US National Guard maneuver training, and US Air Force flight tests, mostly from nearby Hill Air Force Base in Davis County, UT. DPG is controlled by the United States Army Test and Evaluation Command (ATEC). The area was also used by Army Special Forces for training in preparation for deployments to the war in Afghanistan.

== History ==
In 1941, the US Army Chemical Warfare Service (CWS) determined it needed a testing facility more remote than the US Army's Edgewood Arsenal in Maryland. The CWS surveyed the Western U.S. for a new location to conduct its tests, and in early 1942, construction of Dugway Proving Ground began, including the establishment of Michael Army Airfield. Since its founding, much of Dugway Proving Ground activity has been a closely guarded secret.

Testing commenced in mid-1942. During World War II, DPG tested toxic agents, flamethrowers, chemical spray systems, biological warfare weapons, fire bombing tactics, antidotes for chemical agents, and protective clothing. During 1943 the "German Village" and "Japanese Village" set-piece domestic "hamlets" were built at Dugway, for practice in the fire-bombing of homes of the types in urbanized areas of Nazi Germany and the Empire of Japan's Home Islands.

In October 1943, DPG established biological warfare facilities at UTTR's range telemetry and tracking radar installation, which is an isolated area within DPG known as the Granite Peak Installation. DPG was slowly phased out after World War II, becoming inactive in August 1946.

The base was reactivated during the Korean War, under Commanding Officer Lieutenant Colonel Speers Ponder, and in 1954 was confirmed as a permanent Department of the Army installation. In October 1958, the United States Army Chemical Center, Maryland, moved the U.S. Army Chemical, Biological, and Radiological Weapons School to Dugway Proving Ground. In the late 1950s and early 1960s, Project Bellwether—a study of weaponized, mosquito-spread infections—was based at DPG.

From 1985 to 1991, Dugway Proving Ground was home to the Ranger School's short-lived Desert Training Phase. It was first known as the Desert Ranger Division (DRD) until redesignated the Ranger Training Brigade's 7th Ranger Training Battalion in 1987, and taught students basic desert survival skills and small unit tactics. The program was later moved back to its original site at Fort Bliss, Texas, in 1991, where it was deactivated in 1995.

On September 8, 2004, the Genesis, a NASA spacecraft, was directed to impact into the desert floor of the Dugway Proving Ground because the topsoil there is like talcum powder, or moondust, and would likely cushion the troubled spacecraft's impact. The Genesis spacecraft's accelerometer had been installed backwards, which caused the spacecraft to malfunction upon re-entry to Earth's atmosphere preventing the originally planned air retrieval.

On January 26, 2011, Dugway Proving Ground was placed on lockdown. Al Vogel, a public affairs specialist for the installation, would only say that the lockdown began at 5:24 p.m. Employees were not allowed to leave, and those coming to work were not allowed in. Vogel said there were no injuries, no damage and no threats reported at the proving ground. There were about 1,200 to 1,400 people at Dugway when the lockdown occurred. It was later announced that the lockdown was in response to the temporary loss of a vial containing VX nerve agent. The lockdown was lifted on January 27 following recovery of the material. The incident was described as a mislabeling problem.

Dugway Proving Ground was also home to the High Resolution Fly's Eye Cosmic Ray Detector, which discovered the first ultra-high-energy cosmic ray. Dugway is home to several radio telemetry and tracking radar (i.e. RIR-777, TPQ-39 (Ver. V) and MPQ-39) sites which track national flight assets during flight tests at UTTR.

Activities included aerial nerve agent testing. According to reports from New Scientist, Dugway was still producing quantities of anthrax spores as late as 2015 to be used to develop anthrax testing detection and countermeasures, more than four decades after the United States renounced biological weapons, and shipping material intended to be inert to military bases and military contractors around the globe. There were at least 1,100 other chemical tests at Dugway during the period of the Dugway sheep incident (see below). In total, almost 500,000 lb (230,000 kg) of nerve agent were dispersed during open-air tests. There were also tests at Dugway involving other weapons of mass destruction, including 328 open-air tests of biological weapons, 74 dirty bomb tests, and eight furnace heatings of nuclear material under open-air conditions to simulate the dispersal of fallout in the case of meltdown of aeronautic nuclear reactors.

On December 13, 2019, the U.S. Air Force said it had kept the Ultra Long Endurance Aircraft Platform (Ultra LEAP) at the Dugway Proving Ground in Utah airborne for two days during testing of the surveillance drone at the site.

=== "Sheep Kill" incident ===
In March 1968, 6,249 sheep died in Skull Valley, an area nearly thirty miles from Dugway's testing sites. When examined, the sheep were found to have been poisoned by an organophosphate chemical. The sickening of the sheep, known as the Dugway sheep incident, coincided with several open-air tests of the nerve agent VX at Dugway. Local attention focused on the Army, which initially denied that VX had caused the deaths, instead blaming the local use of organophosphate pesticides on crops. Necropsies conducted on the dead sheep later definitively identified the presence of VX. The Army never admitted liability, but did pay the ranchers for their losses. On the official record, the claim was for 4,372 "disabled" sheep, of which about 2,150 were either killed outright by the VX exposure or were so critically injured that they needed to be euthanized on-site by veterinarians. Another 1,877 sheep were "temporarily" injured, or showed no signs of injury but ultimately were not marketable due to their potential exposure. All of the exposed sheep that survived the initial exposure were eventually euthanized by the ranchers, since even the potential for exposure had rendered the sheep permanently unsalable for either meat or wool.

The incident, coinciding with the birth of the environmental movement and anti-Vietnam War protests, created an uproar in Utah and the international community.

=== U.S. GAO report ===
The U.S. General Accounting Office issued a report on September 28, 1994, which stated that between 1940 and 1974, DOD and other national security agencies performed "hundreds, perhaps thousands" of weapons tests and experiments involving hazardous substances.

The quote from the study:

... Dugway Proving Ground is a military testing facility located approximately 80 miles southwest of Salt Lake City. For several decades, Dugway has been the site of testing for various chemical and biological agents. From 1951 through 1969, hundreds, perhaps thousands of open-air tests using bacteria and viruses that cause disease in human, animals, and plants were conducted at Dugway ... It is unknown how many people in the surrounding vicinity were also exposed to potentially harmful agents used in open-air tests at Dugway.

There are reports that certain nerve agents such as tetrodotoxin and Datura stramonium have been tested at this military base.

=== Anthrax shipments ===
In May 2015 it was revealed that Dugway lab had inadvertently shipped live anthrax bacillus to locations around the country. Shipped samples, it was said, were supposed to be inert. Labs receiving the live samples were in Texas, Maryland, Wisconsin, Delaware, New Jersey, Tennessee, New York, California and Virginia, the Associated Press reported. Days after the first report, the military divulged that the mis-shipments had been broader than initially reported and launched an investigation. Dugway was involved in developing a test to identify biological threats in the field.

In September 2018, the U.S. Government Accountability Office (GAO) released findings of an investigation into the anthrax shipping lapses made at Dugway. The investigation looked into whether "systemic oversight changes regarding biosecurity have since been implemented across DOD facilities. The findings are mixed." The U.S. Army had sought 35 specific changes, but only 18 of them had been made, as of the GAO report. According to the report, the DOD "had not fully identified the infrastructure capabilities required to address threats, had not planned to identify potential duplication without considering information from existing federal studies, and had not updated its guidance and planning process to include specific responsibilities and time frames for risk assessments."

== UFO speculation ==
Following the public attention drawn to Area 51 in the early 1990s, UFOlogists and concerned citizens have suggested that whatever covert operations may have been underway at that location, if any, were subsequently transferred to DPG.

The Deseret News reported that Dave Rosenfeld, president of Utah UFO Hunters, claimed but provided no proof for "Numerous UFOs have been stored and reported in the area in and around Dugway ... [military aircraft can't account for] all the unknowns seen in the area. It might be that our star visitors are keeping an eye on Dugway too. ... [Dugway is] the new Area 51. And probably the new military spaceport."

Dugway Proving Ground has often made light of the rumors, satirizing the conspiracy on their official social media posts. A 2021 community event at the base had shooting targets with alien profiles set up by the base's police department for children to target with an airsoft gun. A 2023 5K run & 10K run Halloween costume race announced at the base was dubbed the "Alien Invasion" with the tag-line "come see the history of Area 52".

== See also ==
- Aberdeen Proving Ground
- Granite Peak Installation
- Human experimentation in the United States
- Naval Air Weapons Station China Lake
- Oh-My-God particle
- Tonopah Test Range
- Tooele Army Depot
