= Mark 77 bomb =

American air-dropped incendiary bomb

Mark 77
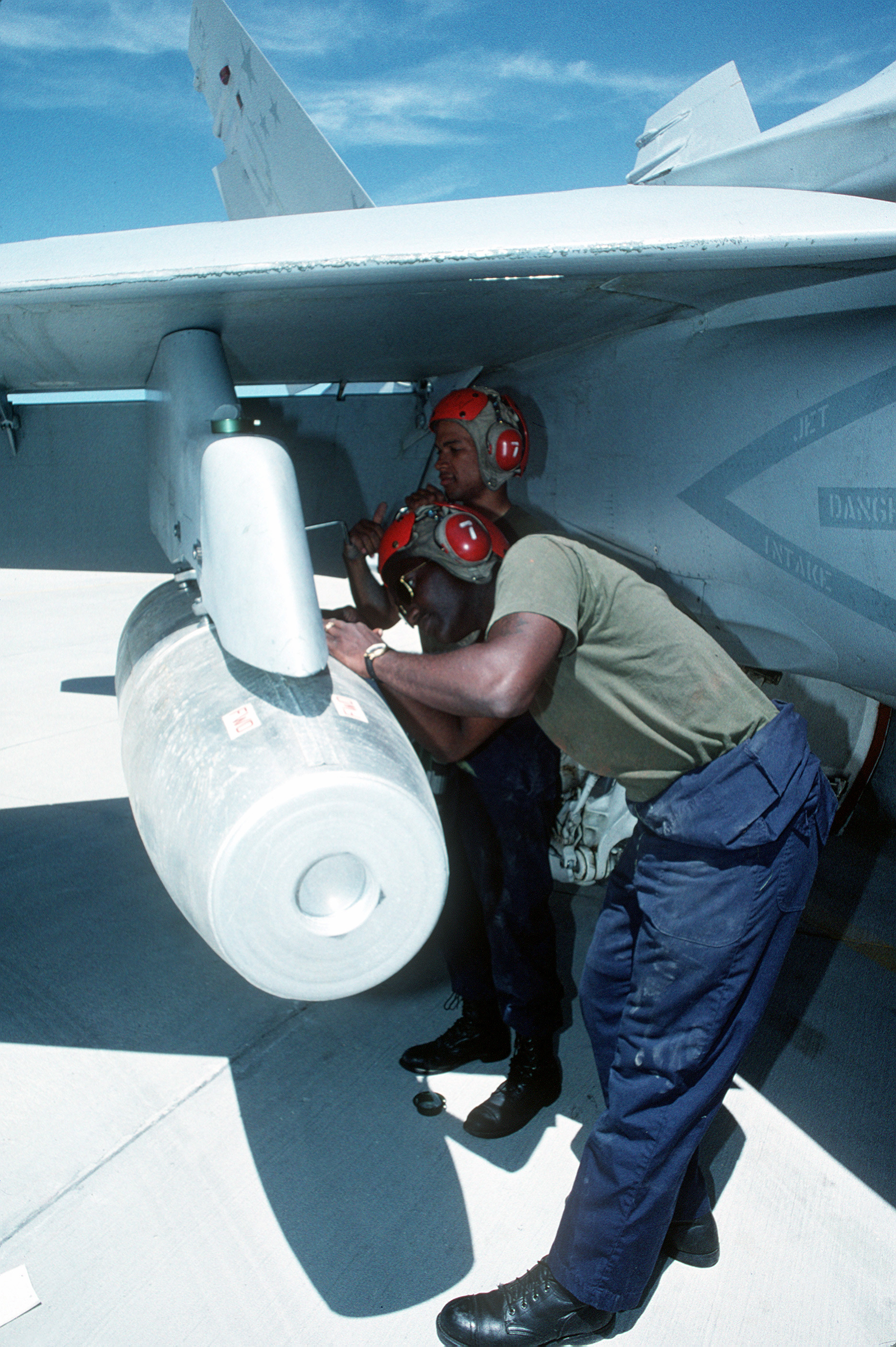
- A Mark 77 bomb being loaded on an F/A-18 Hornet, 1993.
- Place of origin: United States

Service history
- Wars: Cold War; Gulf War; War on terror; Iraq War; War in Afghanistan; Battle of Tora Bora

Specifications
- Mass: 750 lb (340 kg)

The Mark 77 bomb (MK-77) is a United States 750-pound (340 kg) air-dropped incendiary bomb carrying 110 U.S. gallons (416 L; 92 imp gal) of a fuel gel mix which is the direct successor to napalm.

The MK-77 is the primary incendiary weapon used by the United States military. Instead of the gasoline, polystyrene, and benzene mixture used in napalm bombs, the MK-77 uses kerosene-based fuel with a lower concentration of benzene. The Pentagon has claimed that the MK-77 has less impact on the environment than napalm. The mixture reportedly also contains an oxidizing agent, making it more difficult to put out once ignited, as well as white phosphorus.

The effects of MK-77 bombs are similar to those of napalm. The official designation of World War II-era napalm bombs was the Mark 47.

Use of aerial incendiary bombs against civilian populations, including against military targets in civilian areas, was banned in the 1980 United Nations Convention on Certain Conventional Weapons Protocol III. However, the United States reserved the right to use incendiary weapons against military objectives located in concentrations of civilians where such use would be determined to cause fewer casualties and/or less collateral damage than alternative weapons.

== Use in Iraq and Afghanistan ==
MK-77s were used by the United States Marine Corps during Operation Desert Storm and Operation Iraqi Freedom. Approximately 500 were dropped, reportedly mostly on Iraqi-constructed oil filled trenches. They were also used at the Battle of Tora Bora during the Afghan War.

At least thirty MK-77s were also used by Marine Corps aviators over a three-day period during the 2003 invasion of Iraq, according to a June 2005 letter from the UK Ministry of Defence to former Labour MP Alice Mahon. This letter stated:

The U.S. destroyed its remaining Vietnam era napalm in 2001 but, according to the reports for I Marine Expeditionary Force (I MEF) serving in Iraq in 2003, they used a total of 30 MK 77 weapons in Iraq between 31 March and 2 April 2003, against military targets away from civilian areas. The MK 77 firebomb does not have the same composition as napalm, although it has similar destructive characteristics. The Pentagon has told us that owing to the limited accuracy of the MK 77, it is not generally used in urban terrain or in areas where civilians are congregated.

This confirmed previous reports by U.S. Marine pilots and their commanders saying they had used Mark 77 firebombs on military targets:

Then the Marine howitzers, with a range of 30 kilometers [18 1/2 mi], opened a sustained barrage over the next eight hours. They were supported by U.S. Navy aircraft which dropped 40,000 pounds [18,000 kg] of explosives and napalm, a U.S. officer told the Herald. "We napalmed both those [bridge] approaches," said Colonel James Alles, commander of Marine Aircraft Group 11. "Unfortunately there were people there ... you could see them in the cockpit video. They were Iraqi soldiers."

According to the Italian public service broadcaster RAI's documentary Fallujah, The Hidden Massacre, the MK 77 had been used in Baghdad in 2003 in civilian-populated areas. However, Marine pilots stated to the San Diego Union-Tribune that the targets of the bombings were Iraqi soldiers defending civilian infrastructure such as bridges, as opposed to targeting civilians directly.

In some cases where journalists reported that the U.S. military has used napalm, military spokesmen denied the use of "napalm" without making it clear that MK-77 bombs had actually been deployed instead.

U.S. officials incorrectly informed UK Ministry of Defence officials that MK-77s had not been used by the U.S. in Iraq, leading to Defence Minister Adam Ingram making inaccurate statements to the UK Parliament in January 2005. Later both Adam Ingram and Secretary of State for Defence John Reid apologized for these inaccurate statements being made to Members of Parliament.

== Variants ==
Later variants of the bomb were modified to carry a reduced load of 75 U.S. gallons (284 L; 62 imp gal) of fuel, which resulted in the total weight decreasing to around 552 pounds (250 kg).

- Mk 77 Mod 0 - 750 lb (340 kg) total weight with 110 U.S. gallons (416 L; 92 imp gal) of petroleum oil.
- Mk 77 Mod 1 - 500 lb (230 kg) total weight with 75 U.S. gallons (284 L; 62 imp gal) of petroleum oil.
- Mk 77 Mod 2
- Mk 77 Mod 3
- Mk 77 Mod 4 - Approx 507 lb (230 kg) total weight with 75 U.S. gallons (284 L; 62 imp gal) of fuel (Used during the 1991 Gulf War)
- Mk 77 Mod 5 - Approx 507 lb (230 kg) total weight with 75 U.S. gallons (284 L; 62 imp gal) of JP-4/JP-5 or JP-8 fuel and thickener (Used during the 2003 invasion of Iraq)
- Mk 78 - 750 lb (340 kg) total weight with 110 U.S. gallons (416 L; 92 imp gal) of petroleum oil. No longer in service.
- Mk 79 - 1,000 lb (450 kg) total weight with 112 U.S. gallons (424 L; 93 imp gal) of napalm and petrol. No longer in service.

== See also ==
- Mark 81 bomb
- Mark 82 bomb
- Mark 83 bomb
- Mark 84 bomb
- Mark 117 bomb
- Mark 118 bomb

== Endnotes ==
- MK-77 Dumb Bombs, Federation of American Scientists
- Lennox, Duncan (1994). Jane's Air-Launched Weapons 2005-2006. ISBN 978-0-7106-0866-6.
- Army Regulations 600-8-27 dated 2006
