= German Village (Dugway Proving Ground) =

Mock houses built for bombing-tests

Coordinates: 40.139062°N 113.006425°W

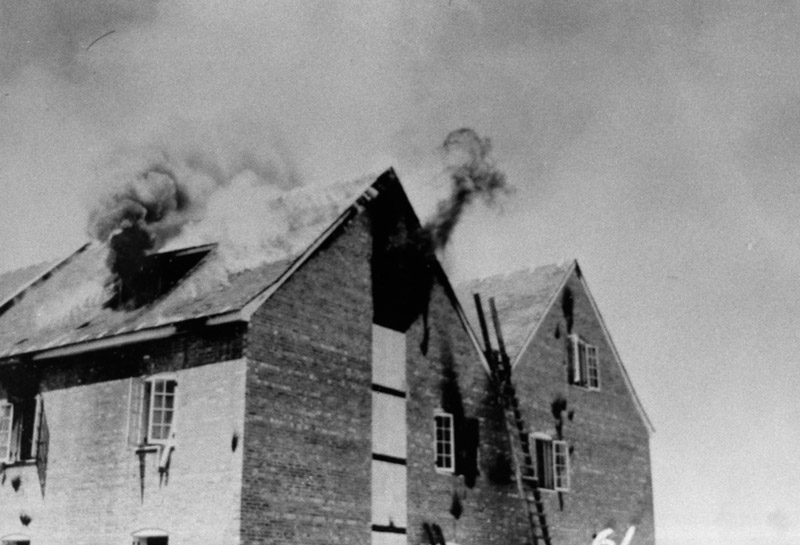
German village during tests of the M69 incendiary

German Village was the nickname for a range of mock houses constructed in 1943 by the U.S. Army in the Dugway Proving Ground in Utah, roughly 85 miles (137 km) southwest of Salt Lake City, in order to conduct experiments used for the bombing of Nazi Germany.

== History ==
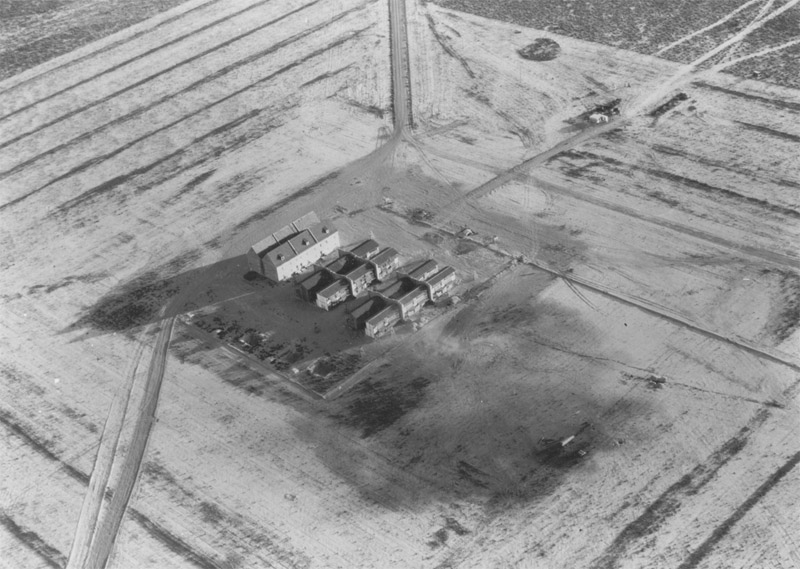
German and Japanese village, aerial view, 1943

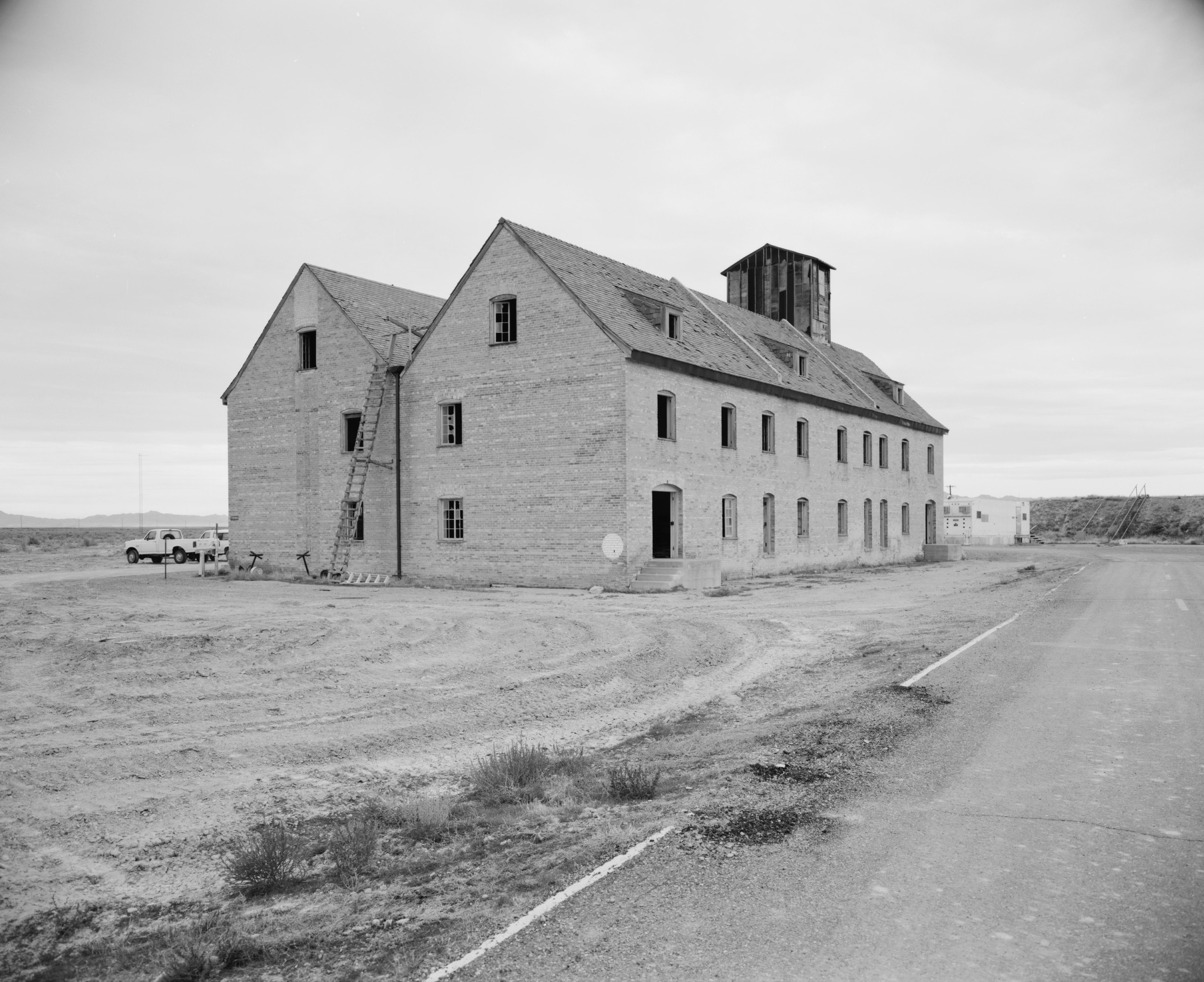
German village in 1994, oblique angle. The roof construction was added in the 1960s

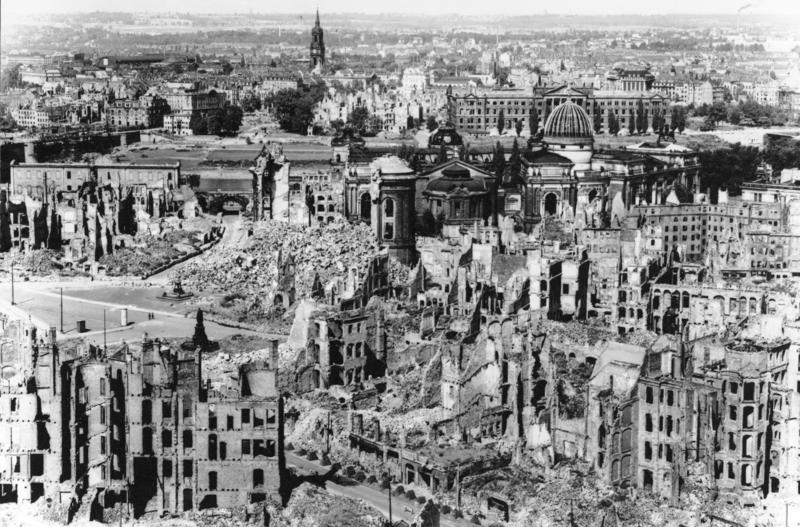
Dresden after the 1945 firebombing raid

Dugway was a high-security testing facility for chemical and biological weapons. The purpose of the replicas of German residential homes, which were repeatedly rebuilt after being intentionally burned down, was to perfect tactics in the fire bombing of German residential areas during World War II.

The U.S. Army employed German émigré architects such as Erich Mendelsohn to create copies as accurate as possible of the dwellings of densely populated poorer quarters of Berlin. The main goal was to find a tactic to achieve a fire storm in the city center.

The architects who worked on the German village and on the Japanese equivalent also included Konrad Wachsmann and Antonin Raymond.

The U.S. Army also hired Standard Oil Development Company to assist in the practical testing and construction. Erich Mendelsohn and Konrad Wachsmann advised on construction techniques and materials. Paul Zucker, Hans Knoll and George Hartmueller advised on designing authentic interior furnishings. Set designers from RKO Pictures were involved in construction. Prisoners from Utah built the six de:Mietskasernen - apartment blocks - in 44 days by May 1943.

The village was authentic down to the smallest details, including authentic German heavy furnishings, clothes hanging in closets and children's toys.

Wood and paint, both for interior and exterior, was selected so it would be authentic both in the German and Japanese village; in the Japanese village there were chopsticks on the tables. The German village cost $575,000 to build.

It was found that it was easier to set fire to Japanese housing, but that German houses were more likely to have uncontrollable fires.

== See also ==
- Japanese Village (Dugway Proving Ground)
- Bombing of Dresden
- Strategic bombing during World War II
