= M47 bomb =

US Army Air Forces WWII chemical bomb

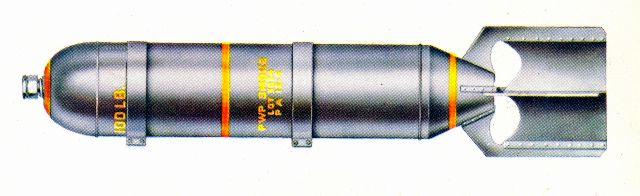

The M47 bomb was a chemical bomb designed during World War II for use by the U.S. Army Air Forces.

== Design ==
The bomb was designed for aerial bombardment and maximum efficiency after being dropped. Therefore, the bomb had a very thin metal sheet as its only cover, as little as 1/32 inch (0.79 mm). The bomb is approximately 8 inches (200 mm) in diameter, with a nose the shape of a hemisphere. The M107 bomb fuse at the nose of the bomb detonated the weapon, allowing for the release of the contents inside. The bomb was designed to carry either white phosphorus (WP) or a mustard agent (H). However, the H bomb filler was found to leak from the bomb when loaded, and the M47 and its variant M47A1 were not allowed to be loaded. This was due to the thin steel walls on the weapon. In storage and handling, both corrosion and rough handling were found to cause the bomb to leak. When the bomb is loaded with the chemical filler H, it weighed approximately 93 pounds (42 kg), 73 pounds (33 kg) of which are from H.

The M47 bomb could also be used as an incendiary device. A mixture of rubber and gasoline could be used in the field to produce a crude incendiary bomb. A mixture of white phosphorus and jelled gasoline also produced a flammable mixture. Other mixtures included: LA-60 in which crude latex was combined with caustic soda, coconut oil, and water, crepe rubber (CR) in which crude latex reduced to a solid by precipitation and kneading, LA-100 in which crude latex was dried until it was 100% solid, smoked rubber sheets (SR) in which crude latex that has been dried over a fire until it is 100% solid. When used with these fillers, the bomb used a 1-pound (0.45 kg) black powder charge to ignite and scatter the incendiary materials. The bomb typically weighed about 85 pounds (39 kg) when the incendiary fillers are used.

== Variants ==
The M47A1 was designed to replace the M47. It has a thicker steel cover that is about 1/16 inch (1.6 mm) thick and an acid resistant corrosion cover inside.
The M47A2 was designed to fix the leaking problems of the M47 when the agent H was carried. On the inside it was coated with a special oil that protected against corrosion from the agent H.

== See also ==
- Air raid on Bari, where a shipload of M47 chemical weapons exploded
- Mk-77, the direct successor of M47
