= Niigata Prefectural Museum of History =

- 新潟県立歴史博物館
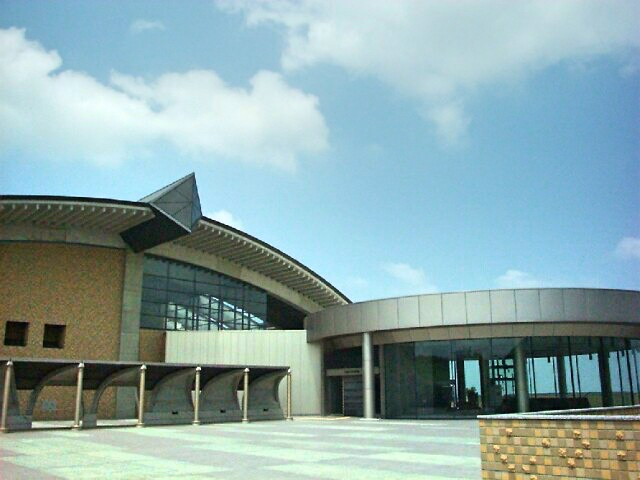
- Interactive map of the Niigata Prefectural Museum of History area

General information
- Location: 1-2247 Sekihara, Nagaoka, Niigata Prefecture, Japan
- Coordinates: 37°26′18″N 138°46′4″E
- Opened: 2000

Technical details
- Floor area: 10,000 m^{2}

Website
- homepage

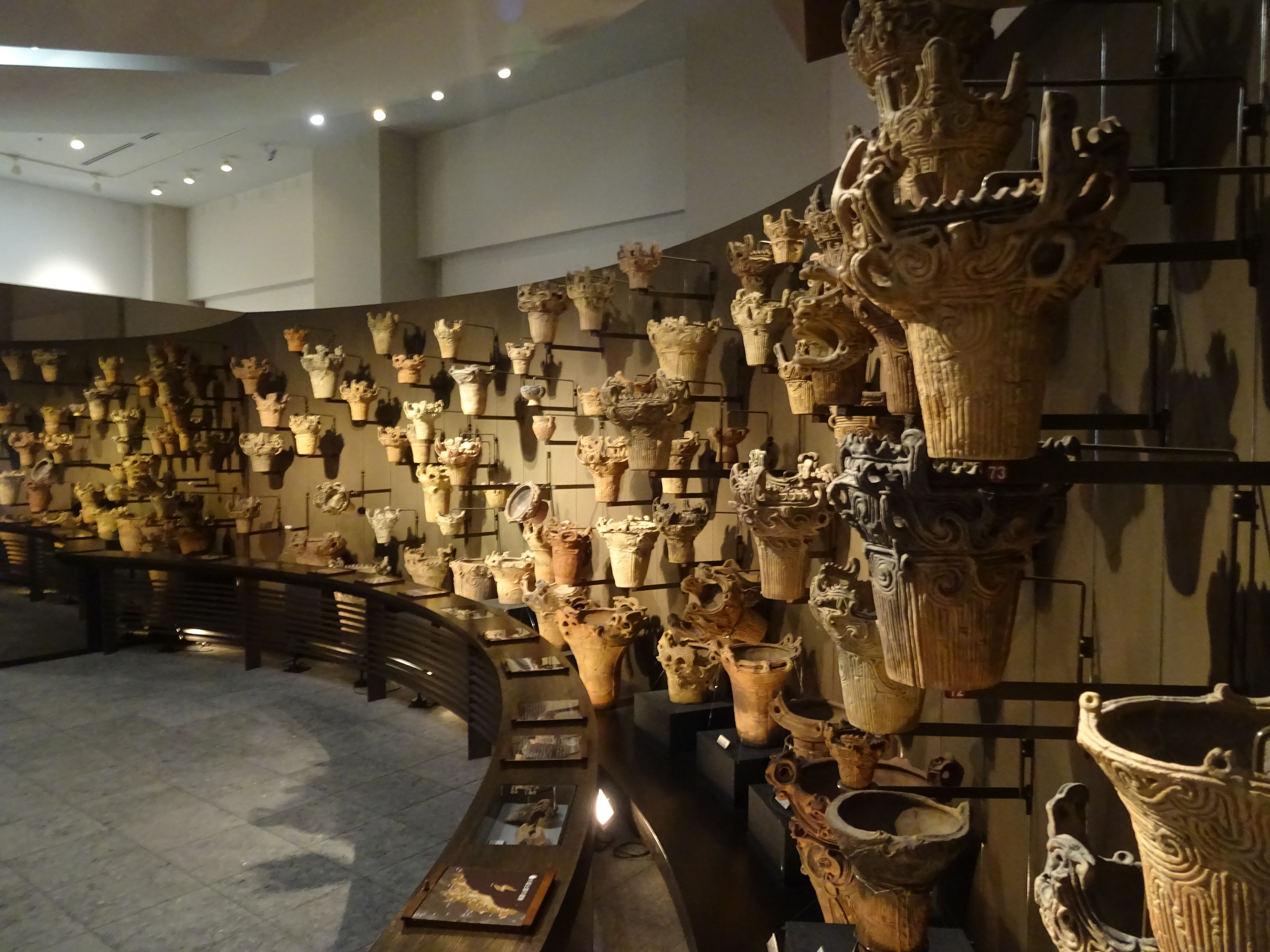
Flame type potteries

Niigata Prefectural Museum of History (新潟県立歴史博物館, Niigata Kenritsu Rekishi Hakubutsukan) is a prefectural museum in Nagaoka, Japan, dedicated to the history of Niigata Prefecture. The museum opened in 2000.

== See also ==
- Echigo Province
- Sado Province
- List of Historic Sites of Japan (Niigata)
