= Protocol on Incendiary Weapons =

Sub-Section of the 1980 Convention on Certain Conventional Weapons

Protocol on Prohibitions or Restrictions on the use of Incendiary Weapons
- Context: Convention on Certain Conventional Weapons
- Effective: 2 December 1983
- Condition: 20
- Parties: 126, As of January 2023
- Depositary: UN Secretary-General
- Languages: Arabic, Chinese, English, French, Russian and Spanish

The Protocol on Prohibitions or Restrictions on the use of Incendiary Weapons is a United Nations treaty that restricts the use of incendiary weapons. It is Protocol III to the 1980 Convention on Certain Conventional Weapons Which May Be Deemed To Be Excessively Injurious Or To Have Indiscriminate Effects. Concluded in 1981, it entered into force on 2 December 1983. As of January 2023, it had been ratified by 126 state parties.

Incendiary weapons as a category does not appear to include thermobaric weapons, and international law does not appear to prohibit the use of thermobaric munitions against military targets. Their use against civilian populations or infrastructure may be banned by this Protocol. As of November 2022, all past attempts to regulate or restrict thermobaric weapons have failed.

== Content ==
The protocol prohibits, in all circumstances, making the civilian population as such, individual civilians or civilian objects, the object of attack by any weapon or munition which is primarily designed to set fire to objects or to cause burn injury to persons through the action of flame, heat or a combination thereof, produced by a chemical reaction of a substance delivered on the target. The protocol also prohibits the use of air-delivered incendiary weapons against military targets within a concentration of civilians, and limits the use of incendiary weapons delivered by other means. Forest and other plants may not be a target unless they are used to conceal combatants or other military objectives.

The protocol lists certain munition types like smoke shells which only have a secondary or additional incendiary effect; these munition types are not considered to be incendiary weapons.

== Review of doctrine ==
An investigation into the doctrine taught by various militaries was conducted sometime after 2001 by the International Committee of the Red Cross as part of its database on Customary International Humanitarian Law. Rule 84 deals with this Protocol.

According to the Harvard University International Human Rights Clinic, Protocol III has several weaknesses. Because it was created with the firebombing campaigns of WWII and Vietnam in mind, it has weaker protections for the use of ground launched incendiary weapons, such as artillery. It also did not foresee the shift to modern counterinsurgency combat, which often occurs in urban settings. The exclusion of munitions with only incidental incendiary effects means that some weapons with incendiary effects remain legal. For example, white phosphorus munitions—which may be used for smokescreens but can also be used to set fires and burn flesh to the bone—remain legal and in wide use.
