= Deaths in June 2024 =

The following is a list of notable deaths in June 2024.

Entries for each day are listed alphabetically by surname. A typical entry lists information in the following sequence:

- Name, age, country of citizenship at birth, subsequent country of citizenship (if applicable), reason for notability, cause of death (if known), and reference.

== June 2024 ==
=== 1 ===
- Erich Anderson, 67, American actor (Friday the 13th: The Final Chapter, Bat*21, Unfaithful), esophageal cancer.
- Raffaele Aurisicchio, 70, Italian politician, deputy (2006–2008).
- Chen Jing, 89, Chinese engineer and metallurgist.
- Artur Chilingarov, 84, Russian polar explorer and politician, member of the State Duma (1993–2011, since 2016) and senator (2011–2014).
- Hope Chisanu, 40, Malawian actor and radio personality.
- José Domínguez Abascal, 70, Spanish politician and engineer, secretary of state for energy (2018–2020).
- Antonio Ferraz, 94, Spanish road racing cyclist.
- Henry Gunstone, 83, Australian footballer (South Melbourne) and cricketer (Richmond Cricket Club).
- Harry van Hoof, 81, Dutch conductor ("Ding-a-dong", "I See a Star"), composer ("How Do You Do") and music arranger.
- Andrzej Kostenko, 87, Polish screenwriter (Ręce do góry, Le Départ) and actor (When Angels Fall).
- Maguni Charan Kuanr, 87, Indian puppeteer.
- Ruth Maria Kubitschek, 92, Czechoslovak-born German actress (He Can't Stop Doing It, Madame and Her Niece, Tears of Blood).
- Philippe Leroy, 93, French actor (The Hole, The Life of Leonardo da Vinci, Sandokan).
- Salvador Miranda, 84, Cuban-born American bibliographer, librarian and church historian.
- Gary Nairn, 73, Australian politician, MP (1996–2007) and special minister of state (2006–2007), cancer.
- Mary-Lou Pardue, 90, American geneticist and academic.
- Janusz Rewiński, 74, Polish actor and politician, MP (1991–1993).
- Dick Sears, 81, American politician, member of the Vermont Senate (since 1993).
- Mitchell A. Seligson, 78, American political scientist.
- Q. S. Serafijn, 64, Dutch conceptual artist, author, and sculptor.
- Haskell Small, 75, American composer, pianist, and music teacher.
- Tin Oo, 97, Burmese general and politician, minister of defence (1974–1977) and commander-in-chief of defence services (1974–1976).
- Roman Verostko, 94, American artist and academic.
- Ben White, 52, American finance journalist (CNBC).
- Murisi Zwizwai, 54, Zimbabwean politician, MP (2003–2023).

=== 2 ===
- Larry Allen, 52, American Hall of Fame football player (Dallas Cowboys, San Francisco 49ers).
- Leila Barbara, 86, Brazilian linguist.
- Wensley Bundel, 75, Surinamese football player (Transvaal, national team) and manager (national team).
- Rob Burrow, 41, English rugby league player (Leeds Rhinos, Yorkshire, national team), complications from motor neurone disease.
- Carl Cain, 89, American basketball player (Iowa Hawkeyes), Olympic champion (1956).
- Jeannette Charles, 96, British actress (National Lampoon's European Vacation, The Naked Gun, Austin Powers in Goldmember).
- Edgardo Cozarinsky, 85, Argentine writer and filmmaker (One Man's War).
- Mohammed Dahman, 65, Syrian Olympic footballer (1980).
- Emma Lou Diemer, 96, American composer.
- Donovan Ebanks, 72, Cayman diplomat, acting governor (2009–2010).
- Edward J. Fraughton, 85, American sculptor, blood cancer.
- Elizabeth Freeman, 57, American scholar, cancer. (death announced on this date)
- Uzi Geller, 93, Israeli chess master.
- Maciej Gliwicz, 85, Polish biologist.
- Jerry Hampton, 91, American football and wrestling coach.
- Michael J. Karels, 67, American software engineer.
- Duane Klueh, 98, American basketball player (Denver Nuggets, Fort Wayne Pistons, Indiana State Sycamores).
- David Levy, 86, Israeli politician, MK (1969–2006), minister of construction (1979–1990) and three-times of foreign affairs.
- Farrel O'Shea, 60, British professional windsurfer.
- Janis Paige, 101, American actress (Please Don't Eat the Daisies, The Pajama Game, It's Always Jan).
- Natasha Ryan, 40, Australian runaway, subject of a disappearance case. (death announced on this date)
- Luigi Saraceni, 86, Italian politician, deputy (1994–2001).
- Armando Silvestre, 98, American-Mexican actor (Rossana, The Miracle Roses, Night of the Bloody Apes).
- T. J. Simers, 73, American sports columnist (Los Angeles Times, The Orange County Register) and television personality (Around the Horn), brain cancer.
- Harold Snoad, 88, British television producer, writer and director (Keeping Up Appearances, Ever Decreasing Circles, Don't Wait Up).
- Barbara Stewart, 72, New Zealand politician, MP (2002–2008, 2011–2017).
- A.B. Williamson, 79, American basketball coach.

=== 3 ===
- Brigitte Bierlein, 74, Austrian jurist, president of the Constitutional Court (2018–2019) and chancellor (2019–2020).
- Ross Booth, 72, Australian footballer (University Blacks).
- Brother Marquis, 58, American rapper (2 Live Crew), heart attack.
- Charoen Chaoprayun, 89, Thai schoolteacher and politician, MP (1979–1996).
- Vagif Huseynov, 81, Azerbaijani military officer and politician, chairman of the Committee for State Security of the Azerbaijan Soviet Socialist Republic (1989–1991).
- Roy Lee Johnson, 85, American R&B and soul songwriter ("Mr. Moonlight"), singer, and guitarist.
- Sabine Ladstätter, 55, Austrian classical archaeologist.
- Lee Chun-seok, 65, South Korean footballer (Daewoo Royals).
- Johannes Lott, 94, Estonian lawyer and politician, chairman of the Supreme Soviet of the Estonian SSR (1975–1978).
- Morrie Markoff, 110, American blogger, writer, and supercentenarian.
- Les Mason, 69, American politician, member of the Kansas House of Representatives (since 2014).
- Jürgen Moltmann, 98, German theologian (University of Tübingen).
- Dag Erik Pedersen, 64, Norwegian road racing cyclist and television host.
- Betty Anne Rees, 81, American actress (Sugar Hill, Unholy Rollers, My Three Sons).
- William Russell, 99, English actor (Doctor Who, The Adventures of Sir Lancelot, The Great Escape).
- Remo Saraceni, 89, Italian-American toy inventor (Walking Piano), heart failure.
- Tony Spear, 87, American space exploration project manager.
- Teremoana Tapi Taio, 79, Cook Islands politician, MP (1999–2004).

=== 4 ===
- Jean Aniset, 89, Luxembourgish Olympic long-distance runner (1960, 1964).
- Charles-Albert Antille, 79, Swiss businessman and politician, MP (1998–2003).
- Asmatullah, Pakistani politician, MNA (2008–2013, 2018–2023).
- Nicholas Ball, 78, English actor (EastEnders, Footballers' Wives, Hazell).
- Yves Beaujard, 84, French illustrator, engraver, and stamp designer.
- B. R. P. Bhaskar, 92, Indian journalist (The Hindu, The Statesman, Deccan Herald) and human rights activist.
- John Blackman, 76, Australian radio and television presenter (Hey Hey It's Saturday), heart attack.
- Ngoy Bomboko, 47, Congolese footballer (TP Mazembe, Gabala, national team), injuries sustained in a fire.
- Francesco Bruni, 95, Italian politician, deputy (1979–1994).
- C.Gambino, 26, Swedish rapper, shot.
- Cheo Chai Chen, 73, Singaporean businessman and politician, MP (1991–1997).
- Gianpaolo Dozzo, 69, Italian politician, deputy (1994–2013).
- Daniel T. Eismann, 77, American jurist, justice (2001–2017) and chief justice (2007–2011) of the Idaho Supreme Court.
- Bill Estabrooks, 76, Canadian politician, Nova Scotia MLA (1998–2013).
- Karin Gundersen, 79, Norwegian literary scholar and translator.
- Kamal Haider, 77, Bangladeshi politician, MP (1986–1988).
- Robert A. Hall, 78, American politician, member of the Massachusetts Senate (1973–1982).
- Keith Jennings, 70, English cricketer (Somerset).
- Parnelli Jones, 90, American Hall of Fame racing driver and team owner (Vel's Parnelli Jones Racing), 1963 Indianapolis 500 winner.
- John Kerr, 90, Australian pathologist.
- Ahmad Shah Khan, Crown Prince of Afghanistan, 89, Afghan royal, head of the House of Barakzai (since 2007).
- Rex Kirton, 82, New Zealand politician, mayor of Upper Hutt (1977–2001).
- Matilda Koen-Sarano, 84, Italian-born Israeli writer.
- Moshe Kotlarsky, 74, American Orthodox rabbi, cancer.
- Aase Moløkken, 94, Norwegian politician, MP (1980–1981, 1982–1989).
- Yves Morin, 94, Canadian cardiologist and politician, senator (2001–2004).
- Jan Reehorst, 101, Dutch politician, MP (1956–1967), mayor of Haarlem (1977–1984).
- Yury Semyonov, 86, Russian economist and politician, first secretary of the Kaliningrad Regional Committee of the Communist Party of the Soviet Union (1989–1991).
- Rishta Laboni Shimana, 38, Bangladeshi actress (Daruchini Dwip) and model, brain haemorrhage.
- Curt Söderlund, 78, Swedish Olympic road racing cyclist (1968).
- Hubert Taczanowski, 63, Polish-born British cinematographer (The Opposite of Sex, Van Wilder: The Rise of Taj, D-War).
- John Todd, 86, Australian football player (South Fremantle) and coach (Swan Districts, West Coast Eagles).
- Marvin Upshaw, 77, American football player (Kansas City Chiefs, Cleveland Browns, St. Louis Cardinals).

=== 5 ===
- Vassilios Brakatsoulas, 95, Greek lawyer and politician, MP (1958–1961, 1989–1996).
- Kaye Breadsell, 82, Australian Olympic gymnast (1960).
- Alexandrina Cernov, 80, Romanian-Ukrainian academic, literary historian and philologist.
- Fred Dallmayr, 95, German-born American philosopher.
- André Desvallées, 92, French museologist.
- Jean-Paul Émin, 84, French politician, senator (1989–2008).
- Akira Endo, 90, Japanese biochemist, pneumonia.
- Daniel Etounga-Manguelle, 81, Cameroonian economist and writer.
- Charles Allsopp, 6th Baron Hindlip, 83, British peer and businessman, member of the House of Lords (1993–1999).
- Adam Kaczmarek, 62, Polish Olympic shooter (1988, 1992).
- Peter C. Knudson, 86, American politician, member of the Utah State Senate (1993–2019).
- Rosalinda López Hernández, 56, Mexican politician, senator (2006–2012) and member of the Congress of Tabasco (2006–2015).
- Aziz Makiqi, 66–67, Kosovar-Albanian handball player (Trepça) and manager. (death announced on this date)
- Charles Maloy, 92, American football player.
- Marijke Mann, 86, Indonesian actress.
- Dicoh Mariam, 79–80, Ivorian chemist.
- Mike Meeker, 66, Canadian ice hockey player (Pittsburgh Penguins).
- Michael Mosley, 67, British television journalist and presenter (The One Show, The Story of Science: Power, Proof and Passion, The Genius of Invention).
- Rosalina Neri, 96, Italian actress (Three Men and a Leg, All the Moron's Men, The Predators) and singer.
- Petter Nome, 69, Norwegian journalist (Dagsrevyen, Dagsavisen), cancer.
- Arch Pafford, 82, Canadian politician.
- Doug Porter, 94, American college football coach (Mississippi Valley State, Fort Valley State).
- Peter Ralph Randall, 88–89, South Africa anti-apartheid publisher.
- Rosa, 24, American sea otter, euthanized.
- Rose-Marie, 68, Northern Irish singer and television personality.
- Reiner Uthoff, 86, German writer and stage director.
- Annie Vautier, 84, French performance artist, stroke.
- Ben Vautier, 88, French visual artist, suicide by gunshot.
- Dame Margaret Wheeler, 92, British midwife and public servant.
- Richard Zuschlag, 76, American ambulance service executive, founder of Acadian Ambulance, cancer.

=== 6 ===
- Abdul Wahid, 64, Indonesian politician, regent of North Hulu Sungai Regency (2012–2021).
- Soupy Campbell, 80, American college football coach (Northwest Cabarrus High School).
- Roberto Cossa, 89, Argentine playwright and theatre director.
- Rexhep Ferri, 86, Kosovar-Albanian artist and writer.
- Dan Flavin, 67, American politician, member of the Louisiana House of Representatives (1996–2005).
- Joseph Hardy, 95, American director (Great Expectations) and producer (Ryan's Hope).
- Éric Hazan, 87, French author and publisher.
- Jacques Insermini, 96, French stuntman and actor.
- Jan Jongkind, 91, Dutch Olympic sailor (1964).
- Glan Letheren, 68, Welsh footballer (Leeds United, Scunthorpe United, Swansea City), peritoneal cancer.
- Fumihiko Maki, 95, Japanese architect (Makuhari Messe, 4 World Trade Center, Aga Khan Museum).
- Alan Millard, 86, British Orientalist.
- Sergei Novikov, 86, Russian mathematician (Novikov conjecture).
- Sir Oliver Popplewell, 96, British judge (Bradford City stadium fire) and cricketer (Cambridge University, Free Foresters).
- El Signo, 69, Mexican professional wrestler.
- Stanley Sue, 80, American clinical psychologist.
- Milovan Tasić, 76, Serbian basketball player (Radnički Belgrade) and actor (Who's Singin' Over There?).
- John Wilmerding, 86, American art collector and curator, heart failure.
- Ahmed Zitouni, 74, Algerian author.

=== 7 ===
- William Anders, 90, American astronaut (Apollo 8) and diplomat, ambassador to Norway (1976–1977), photographer of Earthrise, plane crash.
- Jean-Kasongo Banza, 49, Congolese footballer (AS Vita Club, VfL Wolfsburg, national team).
- David Boaz, 70, American libertarian philosopher, cancer.
- Vincent Duggleby, 85, British radio presenter (Money Box), prostate cancer.
- Geoff Dupuy, 87, Australian footballer (Hawthorn).
- André Ferreira, 59, Brazilian volleyball player, Olympic champion (1992), lymphoma.
- Regina Gordilho, 91, Brazilian politician, deputy (1991–1995).
- A. J. T. Johnsingh, 78, Indian ecologist.
- Siri Kannangara, Sri Lankan-Australian sports medical doctor and trainer.
- Ralph Kasambara, 54, Malawian lawyer, minister of justice (2012–2013), heart failure.
- Russ McCurdy, 84, American ice hockey coach.
- Angus McLaren, 81, Canadian historian, complications from Parkinson's disease.
- Abdul Wahab Al-Nafisi, 90–91, Kuwaiti politician.
- Paul Pressler, 94, American politician and jurist, member of the Texas House of Representatives (1957–1959), judge of the Texas Court of Appeals (1978–1992).
- Greg Quicke, 62, Australian astronomer, astronomy tour operator and author.
- Gerhard Rödding, 91, German politician, member of the Landtag of North Rhine-Westphalia (1980–1987).
- Ernstalbrecht Stiebler, 90, German composer.
- Nozomu Suzuki, 75, Japanese politician, MP (2012–2014), mayor of Iwata (1998–2009).
- Beksultan Tutkushev, 75, Kazakh politician, senator (1995–2008).
- Warren Winiarski, 95, American winemaker.
- Daliyah Yaʼiri, 87, Israeli journalist.
- Dale Yakiwchuk, 65, Canadian ice hockey player (Winnipeg Jets, Milwaukee Admirals, Kalamazoo Wings).

=== 8 ===
- Frank Arnold, 89, American basketball coach (BYU Cougars).
- John Benson, 85, American calligrapher and stonecarver.
- Sergei Beshukov, 53, Russian chess grandmaster.
- Anthony Brummet, 93, Canadian politician, British Columbia MLA (1979–1991).
- Christophe Deloire, 53, French civil rights activist and journalist, brain cancer.
- Oswald Ducrot, 93, French linguist.
- Ewald Frank, 90, German Pentecostal preacher.
- Tom Grljusich, 83, Australian footballer (South Fremantle, Central District).
- Richard B. Hetnarski, 96, Polish-born American academic and translator.
- Roy Ironside, 89, English footballer (Rotherham United, Barnsley).
- Sir Martin Jacomb, 94, British financier.
- Mark James, 83, American songwriter ("Hooked on a Feeling", "Suspicious Minds", "Always on My Mind").
- Charlie Lennon, 85, Irish traditional fiddler and composer.
- Musa Mohamad, 80, Malaysian academic administrator and politician, minister of education (1999–2004) and vice-chancellor of the Universiti Sains Malaysia (1982–1998).
- Akio Nakajima, 88, Japanese politician, MP (1993–1996), member of the House of Councillors (2003–2004).
- Keith W. Olson, 92, American historian.
- Ben Potter, 40, American internet personality, traffic collision.
- Ramoji Rao, 87, Indian conglomerate executive and film producer (Mayuri, Pakarathinu Pakaram, Mouna Poratam), founder of Ramoji Group, heart disease.
- Renukaswamy, 33, Indian man, beaten.
- Nanae Sasaya, 74, Japanese manga artist (Year 24 Group), lung cancer.
- Valery Saykin, 86, Russian politician, deputy chairman of the council of ministers of the Russian SFSR (1990) and MP (1999–2003).
- Maria da Conceição Tavares, 94, Portuguese-Brazilian economist and politician, deputy (1995–1999).
- Klaus Töpfer, 85, German politician, MP (1990–1998), executive director of the UNEP (1998–2006), and minister of environment (1987–1994).
- Éric Vu-An, 60, French dancer, choreographer, and actor (The Sheltering Sky, Les Liaisons dangereuses), brain tumour.
- Chet Walker, 84, American Hall of Fame basketball player (Philadelphia 76ers, Chicago Bulls), NBA champion (1967).
- Dale Walz, 59, American politician, member of the Minnesota House of Representatives (2001–2004).
- Zhu Yongjun, 94, Chinese nuclear specialist.
- Bloodhound Lil Jeff, 21, Chicago drill rapper

=== 9 ===
- Carmen M. Amedori, 68, American politician and journalist, member of the Maryland House of Delegates (1999–2004).
- Lyons Brown Jr., 87, American businessman and diplomat, ambassador to Austria (2001–2005).
- William Carragan, 86, American musicologist, Bruckner expert, stroke.
- Frank Carroll, 85, American Hall of Fame competitive skater and figure-skating coach, cancer.
- Ralph Caulton, 87, New Zealand rugby union player (Wellington, national team) and coach.
- Lynn Conway, 86, American computer scientist, heart disease.
- Simon Cowell, 72, British television presenter (Wildlife SOS) and conservationist, founder of the Wildlife Aid Foundation, lung cancer.
- Lynette Denny, 66, South African oncologist.
- Dennis Hatcher, 71, Australian rower.
- V. Craig Jordan, 76, American-British scientist, kidney cancer.
- Kim Kwang-lim, 94, South Korean poet.
- Marzena Kipiel-Sztuka, 58, Polish actress (The Lousy World).
- Mikhail Kolyushev, 81, Russian Olympic cyclist (1968).
- Svenn Kristiansen, 84, Norwegian politician, mayor of Oslo (2007).
- Yoshiko Kuga, 93, Japanese actress (Equinox Flower, Good Morning, Drunken Angel), aspiration pneumonia.
- James Lawson, 95, American civil rights activist, cardiac arrest.
- Michael Lovell, 57, American academic administrator, president of Marquette University (since 2014), sarcoma.
- Beata Maksymow, 56, Polish Olympic judoka (1992, 1996, 2000).
- Masuo Matsuoka, 89, Japanese politician, MP (1993–1996), member of the House of Councillors (1983–1989, 1998–2004), mayor of Hikari (1971–1982).
- Isabel Moreno, 82, Cuban actress (Lucía, A Successful Man, The Beauty of the Alhambra).
- Skúli Óskarsson, 75, Icelandic weightlifter and powerlifter.
- Robert E. Raiche, 87, American politician, member of the New Hampshire House of Representatives (1965–1972).
- Barbara Repetto, 77, Italian politician, member of the Landtag of South Tyrol (2008–2010).
- Alex Riel, 83, Danish jazz and rock drummer.
- Ernie Ruple, 78, American football player (Pittsburgh Steelers).
- Junichi Seki, 88, Japanese politician, mayor of Osaka (2003–2007).
- David Shrayer-Petrov, 88, Russian-American novelist and poet.
- Ann Spohnholz, 74, American politician, member of the Alaska House of Representatives (1989).
- Edward C. Stone, 88, American scientist and physics professor, director of NASA Jet Propulsion Laboratory (1991–2001), complications from dementia.
- Vitalis Otia Suh, 57, Cameroonian actor, director and producer.
- Earl Taylor, 91, Jamaican Olympic sailor (1964).
- Vincent Waydell Warner Jr., 83, American priest, bishop of the Episcopal Diocese of Olympia (1990–2007).
- William, 90, Brazilian footballer (Cruzeiro, Atlético Mineiro, national team), complications from a fall.
- Klaus Zähringer, 84, German sport shooter, Olympic bronze medalist (1960).

=== 10 ===
- Terry Allcock, 88, English footballer (Bolton Wanderers, Norwich City) and cricketer (Norfolk).
- Willie Carlin, 83, English footballer (Halifax Town, Carlisle United, Derby County).
- Jennifer Cashmore, 86, Australian politician, member of the South Australian House of Assembly (1977–1993).
- Gérard Dériot, 79, French politician, senator (1998–2020), mayor of Cérilly (1995–2001).
- Brad Dusek, 73, American football player (Washington Redskins), complications from amyotrophic lateral sclerosis.
- William Goines, 87, American Navy SEAL, heart attack.
- Michael Graubart, 93, Austrian-born British conductor, composer and academic.
- Steele Hall, 95, Australian politician, premier of South Australia (1968–1970), MP (1981–1996) and senator (1974–1977).
- Nathan Hare, 91, American sociologist.
- Amol Kale, 47, Indian cricket administrator, heart attack.
- Khushboo, 43, Pakistani actress (Ghunda Raj, Jannat Ki Talash, Jungle Queen) and dancer, shot. (body discovered on this date)
- Arnold Mindell, 84, American author, therapist and teacher.
- Abel Nado, 90, Central African military officer and politician.
- Trinitat Neras i Plaja, 82, Spanish businesswoman and politician, member of the Catalan parliament (1980–2003).
- Wallace J. Nichols, 56, American marine biologist (Blue Mind).
- Sheila O'Toole, 94, New Zealand Catholic nun and welfare worker.
- Park Yang-soo, 86, South Korean politician, MP (2000–2004).
- Homer Rice, 97, American football coach (Cincinnati Bengals) and athletic director (Georgia Tech).
- Dame Jennifer Roberts, 71, English jurist, High Court judge (since 2014), cancer.
- Guillermo Segurado, 77, Argentine Olympic rower (1968, 1972).
- Robert Worthen, 77, American politician, member of the Oklahoma House of Representatives (1986–2004).
- Malawians killed in the 2024 Chikangawa Dornier 228 crash:
  - Saulos Chilima, 51, economist and politician, vice-president (2014–2019, since 2020)
  - Patricia Shanil Muluzi, 59, teacher and politician, first lady (1999–2004), member of the National Assembly (2014–2019)

=== 11 ===
- Majed Abu Maraheel, 61, Palestinian Olympic long-distance runner (1996), kidney failure.
- Doris Ilda Allen, 97, American intelligence analyst.
- Alberts Bels, 85, Latvian writer.
- Dixie Browning, 93, American artist and writer.
- Dianne Burge, 80, Australian Olympic sprinter (1964, 1968).
- Bill Burgess, 85, English rugby league footballer (Barrow, Salford, national team).
- Barry Butler, 62, English footballer (Chester City).
- Nancy Cassis, 80, American politician.
- Ernest Cunningham, 87, American politician, member (1969–1998) and speaker (1987–1989) of the Arkansas House of Representatives.
- Paul Darveniza, 78, Australian rugby union player (national team) and neurologist, blood cancer.
- Enchanting, 26, American rapper, complications from a drug overdose.
- Howard Fineman, 75, American journalist and television commentator (NBC News), pancreatic cancer.
- Grace Mary Flickinger, 88, American biologist and athletic administrator (Xavier University of Louisiana).
- Ruth Stiles Gannett, 100, American author (My Father's Dragon, Elmer and the Dragon, The Dragons of Blueland).
- Mansour Guettaya, 74, Tunisian Olympic middle-distance runner (1972).
- Marcel Guilloux, 93, French singer and storyteller.
- Pierre Haarhoff, 91, French Olympic sprinter.
- Françoise Hardy, 80, French singer-songwriter ("Tous les garçons et les filles", "All Over the World") and actress (Grand Prix), laryngeal cancer.
- David Hosier, 69, American murderer, lethal injection.
- Robert Hughes, 96, American Hall of Fame basketball coach.
- Tony Hunter, 64, American football player (Buffalo Bills, Los Angeles Rams).
- Lady Baltimore, American bald eagle, euthanized. (death announced on this date)
- Harry Leinenweber, 87, American jurist and politician, judge of the U.S. District Court for Northern Illinois (since 1985), member of the Illinois House of Representatives (1973–1983), lung cancer.
- Orest Lenczyk, 81, Polish football player (Stal Sanok) and manager (Wisła Kraków, Ruch Chorzów).
- Bill Ligon, 72, American basketball player (Vanderbilt Commodores, Detroit Pistons).
- Tony Lo Bianco, 87, American actor (The Honeymoon Killers, The French Connection, The Seven-Ups), prostate cancer.
- Ethel Lote, 103, British World War II nurse and yoga instructor.
- Kevork Mardirossian, 70, American violinist.
- Gerhard Merz, 71, German politician, member of the Landtag of Hesse (2008–2018).
- Tony Mordente, 88, American actor (West Side Story).
- Allan Mueller, 81, American politician.
- Bill Nankivell, 100, Australian politician, South Australia MHA (1959–1979).
- Violet Neilson, 92, Jamaican politician, MP (1989–1997).
- David Nelson, 62, American LGBT and gun rights activist, lewy body dementia.
- Amos Nur, 86, Israeli-born American geophysicist.
- Marialena Oikonomidou, 67, Greek singer, cancer.
- Gilles Perron, 83, Canadian politician, MP (1997–2008).
- Antonia Ramírez, Indigenous Salvadoran singer, composer and Nawat language activist.
- Dick Rosenthal, 91, American basketball player (Fort Wayne Pistons).
- Iain Ross, 95, Scottish rugby union player.
- Bernd Schmidt, 80, German footballer (Werder Bremen, Hessen Kassel).
- Walter Schmitt Glaeser, 90, German politician, president of the Bavarian Senate (1994–1996).
- Cristino Seriche Bioko, 83, Equatoguinean politician, prime minister (1982–1992).
- Hans Rudolf Spillmann, 92, Swiss sports shooter, Olympic silver medalist (1960).
- Éric Tappy, 93, Swiss operatic tenor (Grand Théâtre de Genève) and academic teacher (Conservatoire de Musique de Genève).
- Rajeev Taranath, 91, Indian classical musician.
- Marina Tarkovskaya, 89, Russian writer and critic.
- Rob Valentine, 83, Scottish rugby union (Hawick Linden) and league (Wakefield Trinity, Great Britain national team) player.
- Victoria, 39, Czech-South African singer, shot.
- Wang Yongzhi, 91, Chinese aerospace engineer, member of the Chinese Academy of Engineering.
- Fred Werner, 90, American composer.
- Shay Youngblood, 64, American writer, ovarian cancer.

=== 12 ===
- Nuel Belnap, 94, American logician and philosopher.
- Henning Borch, 86, Danish badminton player.
- Johnny Canales, 81, Mexican Tejano singer and television host.
- J. Warren Cassidy, 93, American politician and lobbyist, mayor of Lynn, Massachusetts (1970–1972), NRA vice president (1986–1991).
- T. K. Chathunni, 79, Indian football player (Kerala) and manager (Kochin, Mohun Bagan), cancer.
- Norvell Coots, 65, American brigadier general.
- Madhu Deolekar, 92, Indian politician, Maharashtra MLC (1978–1988).
- Fernando José de França Dias Van-Dúnem, 89, Angolan politician, president of the National Assembly (1992–1996), prime minister (1991–1992, 1996–1999).
- William H. Donaldson, 93, American businessman, SEC chair (2003–2005).
- Mike Downey, 72, American newspaper columnist (Chicago Tribune, Detroit Free Press, Los Angeles Times), heart attack.
- Neil Goldschmidt, 83, American politician, U.S. secretary of transportation (1979–1981), governor of Oregon (1987–1991), heart failure.
- Sir Peter Hall, 85, British diplomat, complications from Parkinson's disease.
- Bob Harris, 81, American sportscaster (Duke Blue Devils).
- Ana Jonas, 80, Lithuanian-born American biochemist.
- John Murphy, 86, Canadian politician, MP (1993–1997).
- Ilva Niño, 90, Brazilian actress (Roque Santeiro, História de Amor, Cordel Encantado).
- Josep Pons Grau, 75, Spanish teacher and politician, deputy (1982–1986) and MEP (1986–1999).
- Joe Scaife, 68, American music producer and engineer.
- Ned Schmidtke, 81, American actor (Another World).
- Joseph H. Seipel, 76, American sculptor and conceptual artist.
- Ron Simons, 63, American theatre producer (Vanya and Sonia and Masha and Spike) and actor (The Defenders, After the Wedding), Tony winner (2013).
- Jerry West, 86, American Hall of Fame basketball player, coach, and executive (Los Angeles Lakers), NBA champion (1972) and Olympic champion (1960).
- Vyacheslav Zudov, 82, Russian cosmonaut (Soyuz 23).

=== 13 ===
- Bénédicte Atger, 66, French equestrian, team endurance world champion (1994).
- Jonathan Axelrod, 74, American screenwriter and producer (Every Little Crook and Nanny, Dave's World).
- Tommy Banks, 94, English footballer (Bolton Wanderers, Altrincham, national team), complications from dementia.
- Gert van den Berg, 88, Dutch politician, senator (1995–2011).
- Angela Bofill, 70, American singer-songwriter ("This Time I'll Be Sweeter").
- Frank Boynton, 87, American professional golfer.
- Joan Brady, 84, American-British writer (Theory of War).
- Don De Grazia, 56, American professor and author.
- Sirinal de Mel, 82, Sri Lankan politician, MP (2015–2019).
- Mick Gannon, 81, English footballer (Crewe Alexandra, Scunthorpe, Everton).
- Bernard Gavillet, 64, Swiss road racing cyclist.
- Laurence Gluck, 71, American real estate investor and landlord, amyotrophic lateral sclerosis.
- Benji Gregory, 46, American actor (ALF, Jumpin' Jack Flash, Once Upon a Forest), heat stroke.
- Ada F. Kay, 95, Scottish writer.
- Jacqueline Kudler, 89, American poet.
- Jorge Luque, 88, Colombian Olympic road racing cyclist (1956).
- Standish Meacham, 92, American historian.
- Eijiro Miyama, 89–90, Japanese outsider artist.
- Eric Nilsson, 97, Swedish Olympic middle-distance runner (1952).
- Ludolfo Paramio, 75, Spanish journalist, sociologist, and politician.
- Cynthia Shepard Perry, 95, American diplomat, ambassador to Sierra Leone (1986–1989) and Burundi (1990–1993).
- Sir Larry Siedentop, 88, American-born British political philosopher.
- Skowa, 68, Brazilian singer-songwriter (Trio Mocotó).
- Paul Sperry, 90, American lyric tenor, heart failure.
- Simo Vuorilehto, 93, Finnish businessman (Nokia).
- Zheng Bingqing, 87, Chinese military leader.

=== 14 ===
- Johnny Boone, 80, American marijuana farmer, leader of the Cornbread Mafia.
- Greg Brown, 51, American basketball player (New Mexico Lobos), traffic collision.
- Gerhart Bruckmann, 92, Austrian politician, MP (1986–1994, 1999–2002).
- Sreedharan Champad, 86, Indian circus artist and writer.
- David Davidson, 81, Scottish politician, MSP (1999–2007).
- Eugene Davis, 70, Irish footballer (Athlone Town, St Patrick's Athletic, Bray Wanderers).
- Dendê, 71, Brazilian footballer (Bahia, Flamengo).
- Theo Fischer, 94, Swiss politician, MP (1983–1995).
- Michael Ghiselin, 85, American biologist and philosopher.
- Ali Yaqoub Gibril, Sudanese tribal militia leader (Rapid Support Forces), shot.
- Maurice Godin, 91, Canadian politician, MP (1993–2000).
- Janusz Gronowski, 89, Polish Olympic pole vaulter (1960).
- Robert H. Hudson, 85, American visual artist.
- Gustavo Lorgia, 73, Colombian magician, spinal cord injury.
- Nancy MacKenzie, 81, Peruvian-Mexican voice actress.
- Christiane Mercelis, 92, Belgian tennis player.
- Tomás Andrés Mauro Muldoon, 85, American Roman Catholic prelate, bishop of Juticalpa (1983–2012).
- Dudu Myeni, 60, South African airline executive and convicted embezzler, chairperson of South African Airways (2012–2017), cancer.
- George Nethercutt, 79, American politician, member of the U.S. House of Representatives (1995–2005), progressive supranuclear palsy.
- Gregorio Pérez Companc, 89, Argentine food executive, chairman of Molinos Río de la Plata (since 1998).
- Trygve Reenskaug, 93, Norwegian computer scientist.
- Tagwai Sambo, 87, Nigerian traditional ruler, chief of Moroa (since 1966).
- Pierre-Jean Samot, 89, French politician, mayor of Le Lamentin (1989–2018), deputy (2002–2003).
- Shōichirō Sasaki, 88, Japanese filmmaker.
- Kazuko Shiraishi, 93, Canadian-born Japanese poet, heart failure.
- Robert Solomon, 92, Australian geographer and politician, MP (1969–1972).
- Jean Succar Kuri, 79, Lebanese-born Mexican tourism executive and child pornographer, heart failure.
- Jeremy Tepper, 60, American radio executive (Sirius XM), journalist (Vending Times, Pulse!), and musician, co-founder of Diesel Only Records, heart attack.
- Joshua Wade, 44, American serial killer.
- Guy Warren, 103, Australian painter.
- Sir David Younger, 85, British public servant, lord lieutenant of Tweeddale (1994–2014).

=== 15 ===
- Manfred Ach, 83, German politician, member of the Landtag of Bavaria (1994–2008).
- George L. Bakris, 72, Greek-born American physician.
- Norm Bass, 85, American baseball player (Kansas City Athletics).
- Murlidhar Chandrakant Bhandare, 95, Indian politician, MP (1980–1994) and governor of Odisha (2007–2013).
- Mike Brumley, 61, American baseball player (Detroit Tigers, Boston Red Sox) and coach (Seattle Mariners), traffic collision.
- Kevin Campbell, 54, English footballer (Arsenal, Nottingham Forest, Everton).
- Érik Canuel, 63, Canadian film and television director (Bon Cop, Bad Cop, Red Nose, Hemingway: A Portrait), plasma cell leukemia.
- James Castle, 35, English professional wrestler (Revolution Pro Wrestling), acute myeloid leukemia.
- Frank D'Arcy, 77, English footballer (Everton, Tranmere Rovers, Kirkby Town).
- Charles H. Dingle, 99, American politician.
- Scott Henson, 40, Canadian professional wrestler (ECCW), cardiac arrest.
- James Kent, 45, American chef, Bocuse d'Or USA winner (2010), heart attack.
- Al Kresta, 72, American broadcaster (WDEO), liver cancer.
- Francine Leca, 86, French cardiac surgeon.
- Tarja Liljeström, 78, Finnish Olympic diver (1968).
- John McClelland, 89, English footballer (Portsmouth, Lincoln City, Queens Park Rangers).
- Thomas McCormack, 92, American writer and publisher.
- Enrique Pinder, 76, Panamanian boxer, WBA world champion (1972–1973), heart disease.
- Jeanne Rose, 87, American herbalist.
- Sakae Saitō, 91, Japanese mystery novelist.
- Matija Sarkic, 26, English-born Montenegrin footballer (Shrewsbury Town, Millwall, national team).
- Barbara Schäfer, 89, German politician, member of the Landtag of Baden-Württemberg (1979–1995).
- Ron Simonson, 82, American football coach.
- Jadallah Azzuz at-Talhi, 85, Libyan politician, secretary-general (1979–1984, 1986–1987) and minister of foreign affairs (1987–1990).
- Zofia Wilczyńska, 82, Polish politician, MP (1989–1991, 1993–2005).
- Freddy Willockx, 76, Belgian politician, MEP (1994–1999), mayor of Sint-Niklaas (1989–1994, 2001–2010).

=== 16 ===
- Ludwig Adamovich Jr., 91, Austrian jurist, president of the Constitutional Court (1984–2002).
- Bruce Bastian, 76, American computer scientist and LGBTQ+ philanthropist, co-founder of WordPerfect, lung disease.
- Jan Breytenbach, 91, South African military officer.
- Buzz Cason, 84, American singer and songwriter ("Everlasting Love").
- Paul Chemetov, 95, French architect (Ministry of the Economy and Finance building).
- Chen Zhenggao, 72, Chinese politician, minister of housing (2014–2017), governor of Liaoning (2007–2014), and mayor of Shenyang (2000–2005).
- Jodie Devos, 35, Belgian opera singer (Opéra-Comique), breast cancer.
- Willy Dullens, 79, Dutch footballer (RKSV Sittardia, national team), complications from Alzheimer's disease.
- Evans Evans, 91, American actress (Bonnie and Clyde, The Iceman Cometh, Dead Bang).
- Antonio Luis Ferré, 90, Puerto Rican businessman.
- Barbara Gladstone, 89, American art dealer and film producer (Drawing Restraint 9), stroke.
- Constantine P. Iordanou, 74, Cypriot insurance executive, co-founder of Arch Capital Group.
- Roberto Lückert León, 84, Venezuelan Roman Catholic prelate, bishop (1993–1998) and archbishop (1999–2016) of Coro.
- Lance Leopard, 57, Australian writer, house fire.
- Marcelo Martorell, 79, Argentine Roman Catholic prelate, bishop of Puerto Iguazú (2006–2020).
- Fred Parady, 68, American politician, member (1995–2005) and speaker (2003–2005) of the Wyoming House of Representatives.
- John Peavey, 90, American politician, member of the Idaho Senate (1984–1994).
- Bob Schul, 86, American long-distance runner, Olympic champion (1964).
- Morrie Steevens, 83, American baseball player (Chicago Cubs, Philadelphia Phillies).
- Carl Olof Tallgren, 97, Finnish politician, minister of finance (1970–1971).
- Donna Theodore, 82, American actress (Shenandoah).
- Regina Veloso, 85, Portuguese Olympic swimmer (1960). (death announced on this date)
- Aloyse Warhouver, 94, French politician, deputy (1988–2002), mayor of Xouaxange (1983–2001).
- Dmitri Yafaev, 76, Russian-French mathematical physicist.
- Yip Wai-hong, 94, Hong Kong composer.

=== 17 ===
- Luciano Acquarone, 93, Italian long-distance runner.
- Arvind, 77, Indian-born American computer scientist and professor.
- Mario Alberto Becerra Pocoroba, 68, Mexican lawyer and politician, deputy (2009–2012).
- Leon Berner, 88, Australian footballer (Carlton).
- Paul Coyle, 56, Northern Irish Gaelic footballer (Devenish St Mary's, Swatragh, Fermanagh) and selector.
- Robert A. Dressler, 78, American lawyer and politician, mayor of Fort Lauderdale, Florida (1982–1986).
- Armand Fouillen, 91, French football player (Red Star, AS Cherbourg) and manager (Brest).
- Connor Garden-Bachop, 25, New Zealand rugby union player (Māori All Blacks, Highlanders, Wellington).
- Claudio Graziano, 70, Italian military officer, chief of army staff (2011–2015), chief of the defence staff (2015–2018), and chairman of the EUMC (2018–2022), suicide by gunshot.
- Devinder Gupta, 81, Indian judge.
- Hosenara Islam, Indian politician, Assam MLA (2001–2006). (death announced on this date)
- John Kingston, 88, Australian politician, member of the Legislative Assembly of Queensland (1998–2003).
- Hubert Lauper, 80, Swiss politician, MP (1995–2003), prefect of Sarine District (1976–1996).
- Jacqueline Laurence, 91, French-Brazilian actress (Aquele Beijo, O Dono do Mundo, Água Viva).
- Li Bing, 75, Chinese writer.
- Brian Makepeace, 92, English footballer (Doncaster Rovers, Boston United).
- Ian Mitroff, 86, American organizational theorist.
- Jocelyn Nungaray, 12, American girl, strangled. (body discovered on this date)
- Jonah Ogunniyi Otunla, 69, Nigerian financial accountant, accountant-general of the Federation (2011–2015).
- James E. Paschall, 101, American air force major general.
- Pam Stephenson, 73, American politician, member of the Georgia House of Representatives (2013–2020).
- Milan Urbáni, 79, Slovak politician, MP (2002–2010).
- Ricardo M. Urbina, 78, American jurist, judge of the U.S. District Court for the District of Columbia (1981–2012), complications from Parkinson's disease.
- Claudia Williams, 90, Welsh artist.

=== 18 ===
- Billy Abercromby, 65, Scottish footballer (St Mirren, Partick Thistle, Dunfermline Athletic).
- Anouk Aimée, 92, French actress (La dolce vita, A Man and a Woman, A Leap in the Dark).
- Hermann Amborn, 91, German anthropologist and ethnologist.
- Stojan Andov, 88, Macedonian politician, interim president (1995–1996) and president of the assembly (1991–1996, 2000–2002).
- Nathaly Antona, 49, French politician, MEP (since 2024).
- András Bíró, 98, Hungarian journalist and human rights activist.
- Celia Britton, 78, English scholar.
- James Chance, 71, American musician (James Chance and the Contortions), gastrointestinal disease.
- CJ de Silva, 36, Filipino visual artist, stroke.
- Zafrul Ehsan, 60, Bangladeshi cricket coach (women's national team), acute myeloid leukemia.
- Sara Facio, 92, Argentine photojournalist and publisher.
- Vitaly Fen, 76, Uzbek diplomat.
- Alan Gold, 78–79, British-born Australian novelist.
- Nicolas Gruson, 49, French Olympic swimmer (1996).
- Volodymyr Ivanenko, 69, Ukrainian politician, deputy (2007–2012).
- Gerhard Klingenberg, 95, Austrian actor (Was wäre, wenn...?).
- Lolani Koko, 60, Samoan rugby union (national team) and rugby league (national team) footballer
- Bing Lao, 75, Filipino screenwriter.
- Yoyong Martirez, 77, Filipino Olympic basketball player (1972), actor (Lab en Kisses), and politician, vice mayor of Pasig (2004–2013).
- Willie Mays, 93, American Hall of Fame baseball player (New York / San Francisco Giants, New York Mets), World Series champion (1954), heart failure.
- Dennis Must, 90, American author.
- P. Thankappan Nair, 91, Indian historian.
- Armando Pugliese, 76, Italian stage director and playwright.
- Daniel Patrick Reilly, 96, American Roman Catholic prelate, bishop of Norwich (1975–1994) and Worcester (1994–2004).
- Ashim Saha, 75, Bangladeshi poet and novelist.
- Allan Saxe, 85, American political scientist, philanthropist, and academic, complications from Parkinson's disease.
- Surya Saputra, 56, Indonesian Olympic wrestler (1988).
- Jan Svartvik, 92, Swedish linguist and author (A Comprehensive Grammar of the English Language).
- Anthea Sylbert, 84, American costume designer (Rosemary's Baby, Chinatown, Julia).
- Franjo Vladić, 73, Bosnian footballer (Velez Mostar, AEK Athens, Yugoslavia national team).
- Valerie Winter, 87, Australian Olympic sport shooter (1988).
- George M. Woodwell, 95, American ecologist.

=== 19 ===
- George Edward Alcorn Jr., 84, American physicist, engineer, and inventor, inventor of the X-ray spectroscopy.
- Jesús Aparicio-Bernal, 95, Spanish politician.
- Roland Armitage, 99, Canadian horse breeder and politician, mayor of West Carleton Township (1991–1994).
- Halina Bortnowska, 92, Polish social and ecumenical activist and publicist.
- C. V. Chandrasekhar, 89, Indian Bharatanatyam dancer.
- Chrystian, 67, Brazilian sertanejo singer, polycystic kidney disease.
- Jan Cremer, 84, Dutch author and painter.
- Jan du Preez, 94, South African rugby union player (Western Province, national team).
- Michel Dupuch, 92, French diplomat and government official.
- James M. Franklin, 81, Canadian geologist.
- Arturo González Cruz, 69, Mexican politician, deputy (since 2021) and three-time mayor of Tijuana, complications from injuries sustained in a skiing accident.
- Nicole Goullieux, 92, French runner.
- Silvia Infantas, 101, Chilean singer and actress.
- Fred J. Kader, 85, Belgian-born American pediatric neurologist.
- Mikhail Kryukov, 91, Russian anthropologist and historian.
- Jean-Claude Lefort, 79, French politician, deputy (1988–2007).
- James Loughran, 92, Scottish orchestral conductor, complications from dementia.
- Stefano Malinverni, 65, Italian sprinter, Olympic bronze medallist (1980).
- Kimiyo Mishima, 91, Japanese artist.
- Katsue Miwa, 80, Japanese voice actress (Phoenix 2772, Unico, Calimero), pulmonary embolism.
- Ashin Munindabhivamsa, 77, Burmese monk, Agga Maha Pandita, shot.
- Tom Prasada-Rao, 66, American musician.
- José Ángel Rovai, 87, Argentine Roman Catholic prelate, auxiliary bishop of Córdoba (1999–2006) and bishop of Villa María (2006–2013).
- Hagi Šein, 78, Estonian journalist.
- Luca Trevisan, 52, Italian computer scientist.
- Dave Williams, 78, American football player (St. Louis Cardinals, San Diego Chargers, Southern California Sun).

=== 20 ===
- Gerhard Aigner, 80, German football executive, UEFA chief executive (1999–2003).
- Oleksandr Boichuk, 73, Ukrainian mathematician.
- Chomchai Chatvilai, 73, Thai actress and singer.
- Narsai David, 87, American chef, author, and restaurateur.
- Paul Davidson, 93, American macroeconomist.
- Lothar Gall, 87, German historian.
- Dave Gatherum, 92, Canadian ice hockey player (Detroit Red Wings).
- Peter B. Gillis, 71, American comic book writer (Strikeforce: Morituri, Captain America, Doctor Strange).
- Eberhard Hertel, 85, German Volkstümliche Musik singer.
- Marko Ilešič, 76, Slovene jurist.
- David Johnson, 52, Indian cricketer (Karnataka, national team), fall.
- Drosos Kalotheou, 79, Cypriot footballer (Omonia Nicosia, national team).
- Charles S. Klabunde, 88, American artist.
- Guram Kostava, 87, Georgian fencer, Olympic bronze medalist (1960, 1964).
- Zeev Kun, 94, Hungarian-born Israeli painter.
- Greg Larson, 84, American football player (New York Giants).
- George B. Moffat Jr., 97, American glider pilot and author.
- Russell Morash, 88, American television producer and director (This Old House, The French Chef, The Victory Garden).
- Wally Nash, 95, Australian rules footballer (Hawthorn).
- Chiharu Ogiwara, 67, Japanese Olympic boxer (1984), complications from a heart attack.
- Diego Orejuela, 62, Spanish footballer (Espanyol, Palamós).
- Dylon Powley, 27, Canadian soccer player (FC Edmonton, Atlético Ottawa), traffic collision.
- Andy Rowland, 69, English footballer (Swindon Town, Bury).
- Haviland Smith, 94, American CIA station chief, complications from COPD and COVID-19.
- Donald Sutherland, 88, Canadian actor (M*A*S*H, Ordinary People, The Hunger Games), Emmy winner (1995), COPD.
- Carlos Silva Valente, 75, Portuguese football referee.
- Ion Vianu, 90, Romanian writer and psychiatrist.
- Margarita Voites, 87, Estonian opera singer.
- Phuntsok Wangchuk, 50–51, Tibetan independence activist and political prisoner.
- Reb Wickersham, 90, American racing driver.
- Taylor Wily, 56, American actor (Hawaii Five-0, Forgetting Sarah Marshall, Magnum P.I.) and sumo wrestler.

=== 21 ===
- Béatrice Bulteau, 64–65, French artist.
- Colin G. Campbell, 88, American academic administrator, president of Wesleyan University (1970–1988).
- Busi Cortés, 73, Mexican filmmaker and screenwriter.
- Frederick Crews, 91, American writer (The Pooh Perplex) and critic.
- Romay Davis, 104, American World War II veteran.
- Frank Duckworth, 84, English statistician (Duckworth–Lewis–Stern method), cancer.
- Gianfranco Gardin, 80, Italian Roman Catholic prelate, secretary for the Institutes of Consecrated Life (2006–2009) and archbishop-bishop of Treviso (2009–2019).
- Robert Germain, 90, Haitian politician, minister of public health (1984–1985).
- Carol Handley, 94, British educator, headmistress of the Camden School for Girls (1971–1985).
- Janet Hogan, 79, Australian Olympic swimmer (1960).
- Gerhard Hund, 92, German chess player, mathematician and computer scientist.
- James K. Irving, 96, Canadian conglomerate executive, owner and chairman of J. D. Irving (since 1992).
- Lars Jaeger, 54, Swiss-German author, entrepreneur, and financial theorist.
- Kåre Karlsson, 100, Swedish ski jumper.
- Jamie Kellner, 77, American television executive (Fox, The WB, Turner), cancer.
- Hans Kwofie, 35, Ghanaian footballer (Ashanti Gold, national team), automobile accident.
- Heinz Lanfermann, 74, German politician, MP (1994–1996, 2005–2013).
- Darren Lewis, 55, American football player (Texas A&M Aggies, Chicago Bears), cancer.
- Keith Locke, 80, New Zealand politician, MP (1999–2011).
- Salah Aboud Mahmoud, 82, Iraqi general.
- George A. McManus Jr., 93, American politician, member of the Michigan Senate (1991–2002).
- John Middendorf, 65, American mountain climber.
- Andrzej Mularczyk, 94, Polish writer, screenwriter (All Friends Here, Niespotykanie spokojny człowiek, Take It Easy) and reporter.
- Janos Quittner, 82, Slovak dancer and choreographer.
- Fred Smith, 82, Australian footballer (Collingwood, Sturt), non-Hodgkin lymphoma.
- Torsten Stein, 79, German jurist.
- Don Trahan, 74, American golf instructor.
- Spiridon Vangheli, 92, Moldovan children's author, poet and translator.
- Frederick Vine, 85, English marine geologist and geophysicist.
- Zhang Xuelei, 61, Chinese Olympic basketball player (1988).

=== 22 ===
- Malcolm George Baker, 76, Australian convicted mass murderer (Central Coast massacre).
- Amit Singh Bakshi, 98, Indian field hockey player, Olympic champion (1956).
- Sir Howard Bernstein, 71, British local government officer, chief executive of Manchester City Council (1998–2017).
- Rafael Edri, 86, Israeli politician, MK (1981–1999) and minister of the environment (1990).
- John Edgar Endicott, 87, American academic administrator.
- Johan Dalgas Frisch, 93, Brazilian ornithologist.
- Lenie Gerrietsen, 94, Dutch Olympic gymnast (1948, 1952).
- Richard Goldstein, 97, American astronomer.
- Kamala Hampana, 88, Indian writer and literary scholar, heart attack.
- Mogens Herman Hansen, 83, Danish classical philologist and classical demographer.
- Sidiba Koulibaly, Guinean diplomat and soldier, chief of staff for the Republic of Guinea Armed Forces (2021–2023), cardiac arrest.
- Péter Kovács, 64, Hungarian gymnast, Olympic bronze medalist (1980).
- John A. McDougall, 77, American physician and author.
- Lala Mnatsakanyan, 66, Armenian actress.
- Gabby Nsiah Nketiah, 80, Ghanaian businessman and diplomat.
- Beatrix Nobis, 74, German art historian.
- Robert L. Norton, 85, American engineer and academic.
- Dale Planck, 53, American dirt modified racing driver.
- Donald Scott, 96, Scottish rugby union player (Langholm, South of Scotland District, national team).
- Paul Stein, 85, Australian jurist, judge of the New South Wales Court of Appeal (1997–2003).
- Alfred Teschl, 99, Austrian politician, MP (1970–1986).
- Khenpo Tsultrim Gyamtso Rinpoche, 90, Tibetan Buddhist scholar.

=== 23 ===
- Tanri Abeng, 82, Indonesian businessman and politician, minister of state owned enterprises (1998–1999).
- Bernard Allen, 79, Irish politician, TD (1981–2011).
- Claude Buchon, 75, French Olympic cyclist (1976).
- Stathis Chatzilampros, 26, Greek footballer (Levadiakos, Thiva), traffic collision.
- Dennis Deer, 51, American politician, member of the Cook County Board of Commissioners (since 2017).
- Walter J. Gray, 96, American politician, member of the Rhode Island Senate (1991–1995).
- Kaz Hosaka, 65, Japanese-American dog handler, brain injury.
- Harold Jaffe, 85, American writer.
- Julio Foolio, 26, American rapper, shot.
- Nikolay Kotelnikov, 66, Russian Orthodox protoiereus, rector of the Church of the Intercession of the Holy Virgin of Derbent, shot.
- Michael Krause, 77, German field hockey player, Olympic champion (1972).
- Olav T. Laake, 89, Norwegian judge and politician.
- Adebayo Lawal, 83, Nigerian politician and air force commander, military governor of Benue State (1978–1979).
- Joseph L. Levesque, 85, American academic administrator, president of Niagara University (2000–2013).
- Ma Zupeng, 98, Chinese politician.
- Angelo Paina, 75, Italian footballer (Milan, SPAL, Atalanta), complications from Alzheimer's disease.
- Tamayo Perry, 49, American surfer and actor (Pirates of the Caribbean: On Stranger Tides, Blue Crush), shark attack.
- Glen Rowling, 93, New Zealand community leader.
- Sakini Ramachandraih, 61, Indian folk singer and dhol player.
- Sergeant Cecil, 25, British Thoroughbred horse.
- Shi Qirong, 95, Chinese industrial manager.
- Bud S. Smith, 88, American film editor (The Exorcist, Sorcerer, Flashdance), respiratory failure.
- David Tunley, 94, Australian musicologist.
- Hugo Villanueva, 85, Chilean footballer (Universidad de Chile, national team).
- Willi Waike, 86, German politician, member of the Landtag of Lower Saxony (1982–1994).
- Doris Y. Wilkinson, 88, American sociologist.

=== 24 ===
- Kari Aartoma, 65, Finnish poet, translator, and columnist.
- Marc Ambroise-Rendu, 94, French journalist (Le Monde).
- Humberto Horacio Ballesteros, 80, Argentine footballer (Lanús, Universitario de Deportes, Millonarios).
- Anton Blok, 89, Dutch anthropologist.
- Anna Dmitrieva, 83, Russian tennis player and sports commentator.
- Mike Farnan, 83, Irish-born Canadian politician, Ontario MPP (1987–1995), assisted suicide.
- Fred Fenster, 89–90, American metalsmith.
- Orlando H. Garrido, 93, Cuban biologist and tennis player.
- J. Samuel Glasscock, 92, American politician, member of the Virginia House of Delegates (1970–1992).
- Melvin M. Hawkrigg, 93, Canadian football player (Hamilton Tiger-Cats) and academic administrator, chancellor of McMaster University (1998–2007).
- Kyle Hummel, 88, American politician, member of the Iowa House of Representatives (1979–1989).
- Dragan Kapičić, 75, Serbian Olympic basketball player (1972) and executive.
- Tom Kent, 69, American radio personality, cancer.
- Larry Light, 83, American marketing executive (I'm Lovin' It), aspiration pneumonia.
- Ann Lurie, 79, American philanthropist, co-founder of the Ann and Robert H. Lurie Foundation, brain cancer.
- Günter Petersmann, 83, German Olympic rower (1972).
- Len Roe, 92, English footballer (Brentford).
- Susana Ruiz Cerutti, 83, Argentine diplomat and politician, minister of foreign affairs and worship (1989).
- Shifty Shellshock, 49, American singer (Crazy Town) and songwriter ("Butterfly", "Starry Eyed Surprise"), drug overdose.
- Dzianis Sidarenka, 48, Belarusian diplomat, ambassador to Germany (2016–2024), suicide by jumping.
- Joan Benedict Steiger, 96, American actress (General Hospital), complications from a stroke.
- Rob Stone, 55, American music promoter, founder of Cornerstone and co-founder of The Fader, cancer.
- Gunnar Stubseid, 76, Norwegian fiddler. (death announced on this date)
- David Thomas, 96, British Olympic field hockey player.
- Alexandros Tombazis, 85, Greek architect (Basilica of the Holy Trinity).

=== 25 ===
- Larry Anastasi, 89, American Olympic fencer (1964, 1968).
- Sika Anoaʻi, 79, American Samoan Hall of Fame professional wrestler (The Wild Samoans).
- Mohamed Arif, 38, Maldivian footballer (VB Sports Club, Club Eagles, national team), meningococcal disease.
- Ana M. Briongos, 77, Spanish writer.
- Jewel Brown, 86, American jazz and blues singer, colon cancer.
- Joshua Bryant, 83, American actor (First Monday in October, The Rockford Files, Barnaby Jones), founder of the Taos Talking Pictures Film Festival.
- José Cademartori, 93, Chilean politician, deputy (1957–1973), minister of economy, development, and reconstruction (1973).
- Billy Carter, 86, Canadian ice hockey player (Montreal Canadiens, Boston Bruins, Denver Spurs).
- Kamal Chaudhry, 76, Indian politician, MP (1984–1996, 1998–1999).
- John Cheetham, 85, American composer.
- Bill Cobbs, 90, American actor (The Bodyguard, The Hudsucker Proxy, Air Bud).
- Anton van Dalen, 86, Dutch-American artist.
- Benjamin Davidovich, 94, Israeli footballer (Maccabi Haifa).
- John DeFrancesco, 83, American jazz organist and singer.
- Fredl Fesl, 76, German musician, Parkinson's disease.
- Tam Fiofori, 82, Nigerian documentary photographer.
- Tommie Gorman, 68, Irish journalist (RTÉ).
- Tony Macedo, 86, Gibraltarian footballer (Fulham, Highlands Park, Colchester United). (death announced on this date)
- Paul Melicharek, 32, American football player.
- Kaus Mia, 92, Bangladeshi tobacco executive.
- Mícheál Ó Muircheartaigh, 93, Irish Gaelic games commentator (RTÉ).
- Michael Petach, 64, American engineer.
- Shayne Philpott, 58, New Zealand rugby union player (Canterbury, national team).
- Roger Barows, 8, Japanese Thoroughbred racehorse, Tōkyō Yūshun winner (2019).
- Norman Shetler, 93, American-born Austrian pianist and puppeteer.
- Ray St. Germain, 83, Canadian singer, author and television host.
- José Antonio Urtiaga, 81, Spanish footballer (Valencia, Atlético Madrid, Real Sociedad).
- Alvin Wolfe, 96, American anthropologist.

=== 26 ===
- Peter Armbruster, 92, German physicist, co-discoverer of six synthetic chemical elements.
- Magalan Ugochukwu Awala, 34, Nigerian footballer (Chittagong Abahani, Brothers Union), heart attack.
- Sergei Berezin, 52, Russian ice hockey player (Toronto Maple Leafs, Chicago Blackhawks, Phoenix Coyotes).
- Keith Bromage, 86, Australian footballer (Collingwood, Fitzroy), brain cancer.
- Carlos Cascos, 71, American politician, Texas secretary of state (2015–2017).
- Jackie Clarkson, 88, American politician, member of the Louisiana House of Representatives (1994–2002), three-time member of the New Orleans City Council.
- Jim Connors, 77, American politician, mayor of Scranton, Pennsylvania (1990–2002).
- Muchkund Dubey, 90, Indian civil servant, foreign secretary (1990–1991).
- Raimundo Frometa, 69, Cuban Olympic footballer (1980).
- Gary Grant, 78, American trumpeter, composer, and music producer.
- Kendal Hanna, 88, Bahamian painter and sculptor.
- Pat Heywood, 92, Scottish actress (Romeo and Juliet, 10 Rillington Place, Wuthering Heights).
- Bakhyt Kenjeev, 73, Kazakh-Russian poet.
- Karl-Hans Laermann, 94, German politician, MP (1974–1998), minister of education and research (1994).
- Taiki Matsuno, 56, Japanese actor (Kusa Moeru, Yu-Gi-Oh! GX, Digimon Data Squad), intracranial hemorrhage.
- John McNiven, 89, Scottish weightlifter.
- Frank Nunley, 78, American football player (San Francisco 49ers).
- Esther Pasztory, 81, Hungarian-born American art historian.
- Barry Pullen, 84, Australian politician, member of the Victorian Legislative Council (1982–1999).
- Carolyn Richmond, 86, American literary scholar and translator.
- Stefan Romaniw, 68, Ukrainian-Australian activist, first vice-president of the Ukrainian World Congress (since 2018).
- Superstar Leo, 26, British Thoroughbred racehorse. (death announced on this date)
- Steffen Tangstad, 65, Norwegian boxer, complications from peripheral neuropathy.
- Nathaniel Tarn, 95, French-American poet.
- Richard Taylor, 89, British politician, MP (2001–2010), bowel cancer and dementia.
- Peter Theisinger, 78, American engineer, throat cancer.
- Louie Tillet, 89, French professional wrestler.
- Judith Whelan, 63, Australian journalist and newspaper editor.
- Renauld White, 80, American model and actor (Guiding Light).
- Wimpy Winther, 76, American football player (Green Bay Packers, New Orleans Saints, Alabama Vulcans).
- Yaşar Yakış, 85, Turkish diplomat and politician, minister of foreign affairs (2002–2003) and MP (2002–2011).

=== 27 ===
- Cristina Alberdi, 78, Spanish lawyer and politician, deputy (1996–2003), minister of social affairs (1993–1996) and member of the CGPJ (1985–1990).
- Hugh Aldons, 99, Sri Lankan field hockey (national team), cricket (national team), and rugby union (national team) player.
- Mark Ardington, 48, British visual effects artist (Ex Machina, Ant-Man, Exodus: Gods and Kings), Oscar winner (2016).
- Nancy Azara, 84, American sculptor, heart failure.
- Fernando Bolea, 59, Spanish Olympic handball player (1992).
- Roger Briggs, 87, Canadian Anglican priest.
- Shaun Casey, 70, American model.
- Chang Yuan-chih, 35, Taiwanese climber, fall.
- Charles W. Coker, 91, American business executive.
- Alon Confino, 65, Israeli historian and author (A World Without Jews).
- Dragan Đurović, 64, Montenegrin politician, deputy prime minister (2001–2007).
- Manuel Fernandes, 73, Portuguese football player (Sporting CP, national team) and manager (Vitória Setúbal).
- Orville Frenette, 97, Canadian judge, deputy judge of the Federal Court (since 2007).
- Kinky Friedman, 79, American musician, writer, and politician, complications from Parkinson's disease.
- Ilse Fuskova, 95, Argentine LGBT rights activist.
- Henry G. Hager, 90, American politician, member of the Pennsylvania State Senate (1973–1984).
- Chris Hutchins, 83, English author, journalist, and public relations practitioner.
- Des James, 71–72, Australian footballer (Sandy Bay).
- Alexander Knaifel, 80, Russian composer (The Canterville Ghost).
- Pavel Kushnir, 39, Russian pianist, writer, and political activist, hunger strike.
- William Washington Larsen Jr., 93, American politician, member of the Georgia House of Representatives (1971–1976).
- Marc Laviolette, Canadian trade unionist, president of the Confédération des syndicats nationaux (1999–2002).
- Martin Mull, 80, American actor (Clue, Sabrina the Teenage Witch, Roseanne) and musician.
- Maria Nápoles, 87, Portuguese Olympic fencer (1960).
- Landry Nguémo, 38, Cameroonian football player (Nancy, Bordeaux, national team) and manager, traffic collision.
- Rico Sempurna Pasaribu, 47, Indonesian journalist, fire.
- Sir Jack Petchey, 98, English football executive and philanthropist, chairman of Watford (1987–1994).
- Lubomyr Romankiw, 93, Canadian-American computer scientist and researcher, IBM Fellow (1986).
- Norman H. Smith, 88, American lieutenant general.
- Alberto Tricarico, 96, Italian Roman Catholic prelate, apostolic delegate to Malaysia (1987–1993) and Myanmar (1990–1993), apostolic pro-nuncio to Thailand (1987–1993).
- Yosh Uchida, 104, American judo coach (San Jose State University).
- Alan Westwater, 78, Scottish-Australian footballer (Stirling Albion, Sydney Olympic FC, Australia national team).

=== 28 ===
- Gene Achtymichuk, 91, Canadian ice hockey player (Montreal Canadiens, Detroit Red Wings).
- Rudy Andeweg, 72, Dutch political scientist.
- Jim Barrows, 80, American Olympic alpine skier (1968).
- Lando Bartolini, 87, Italian operatic tenor.
- Jacques Berthelot, 78, French politician, mayor of Brest (1983–1985), member of the General Council of Finistère (1985–1998).
- Txema Blasco, 82, Spanish actor (Vacas, By My Side Again, What You Never Knew).
- Orlando Cepeda, 86, Puerto Rican Hall of Fame baseball player (San Francisco Giants, Atlanta Braves, St. Louis Cardinals), World Series champion (1967).
- Peter Collins, 73, English record producer (Power Windows, Operation: Mindcrime, These Days), pancreatic cancer.
- Peter Crittle, 85, Australian rugby union player (national team), coach and administrator.
- Francisco Díaz Yubero, 81, Spanish agronomist and politician, member of the Parliament of La Rioja (1983–1987).
- Verena Diener, 75, Swiss politician, National Council (1987–1998), Government Council of Zürich (1995–2007), Council of States (2007–2015).
- Dudu, 84, Brazilian football player (Palmeiras, national team) and manager (Palmeiras), abdominal infection.
- Audrey Flack, 93, American artist.
- Maurice Fournier, 91, French Olympic high jumper (1956, 1960).
- Kostis Gontikas, 90, Greek politician, MP (1974–1981) and MEP (1981–1984).
- Sandy Hampton, 89, American bishop.
- Yves Herbet, 78, French football player (Nancy, national team) and manager (FC Martigues).
- Robert Irwin, 77, British author (The Arabian Nightmare, For Lust of Knowing, Memoirs of a Dervish) and scholar.
- Mohamed Osman Jawari, 78, Somali politician, speaker of the Parliament (2012–2018) and acting president (2012).
- Kong Nay, 80, Cambodian musician and chapei dang veng player.
- Arvo Kraam, 53, Estonian footballer (national team).
- Donna Reed Miller, 77, American politician, member of the Philadelphia City Council (1996–2012).
- Joss Naylor, 88, English fell runner.
- Nyah Mway, 13, Thai-born American refugee, shot.
- Betty Oberacker, 91, American pianist.
- Marty Pavelich, 96, Canadian ice hockey player (Detroit Red Wings), four-time Stanley Cup champion, complications from amyotrophic lateral sclerosis.
- Ralph Prendergast, 87, Irish hurler and Gaelic footballer (Claughaun GAA, Limerick GAA, New York GAA).
- Helmut Richert, 82, German football player (Fortuna Düsseldorf, Leverkusen) and manager (Holstein Kiel).
- Shi Jin-Hua, 60, Taiwanese contemporary artist, traffic collision.
- Chi Wang, 94, Chinese-American librarian and scholar.

=== 29 ===
- William Charles Langdon Brown, 92, British banker.
- William E. Burrows, 87, American author (Deep Black), kidney failure.
- Johnny Cooke, 89, English boxer, pneumonia.
- Pål Enger, 57, Norwegian footballer (Vålerenga), art thief (The Scream), and painter.
- Luciano Giovannetti, 89, Italian Roman Catholic prelate, auxiliary bishop of Arezzo (1978–1981) and bishop of Fiesole (1981–2010).
- Shraga Feivish Hager, 66, American Hasidic rabbi.
- Hans Hoogveld, 77, Dutch Olympic water polo player (1968, 1972).
- Brooks Johnson, 90, American sprinter and track coach.
- Jacqueline de Jong, 85, Dutch painter, sculptor, and visual artist, liver cancer.
- Princess Lalla Latifa Amahzoune, 78, Moroccan royal consort.
- William F. Mullen III, 59, American Marine Corps major general.
- Olle Olsson, 76, Swedish handball player (Lugi HF, AIK, national team) and coach.
- Eirlys Parri, 74, Welsh singer.
- Ramesh Rathod, 57, Indian politician, MP (2009–2014) and Andhra Pradesh MLA (1999–2004).
- Lionel Salem, 87, French theoretical chemist.
- Doug Sheehan, 75, American actor (Knots Landing).
- Shi Ping, 112, Chinese political administrator and academic, vice president of CAU (1953–1960), secretary of ECNU (1978–1983), secretary general of SMPC (1983–1985) and world's oldest living man (since 2024).
- Joan Specter, 90, American politician, member of the Philadelphia City Council (1980–1996), complications from dementia.
- D. Srinivas, 75, Indian politician, MP (2016–2022) and Andhra Pradesh MLA (1989–1994, 1999–2009), heart attack.
- Mildred T. Stahlman, 101, American neonatologist and academic.
- Syed Husin Ali, 87, Malaysian politician, senator (2009–2015).
- Martti Wallén, 75, Finnish operatic bass singer (Royal Swedish Opera).
- Patty Waters, 78, American jazz vocalist.
- Yang Sok-il, 87, South Korean-Japanese novelist.
- David Young, 66, American video game composer (Sonic CD, Spider-Man vs. The Kingpin, Ecco: The Tides of Time), cancer.

=== 30 ===
- Bill Atkins, 90, American politician, member of the Georgia House of Representatives (1983–1994).
- Hallvard Bakke, 81, Norwegian politician, minister of trade (1976–1979) and culture (1986–1989), chairman of the NRK (2006–2010).
- Lucius Banda, 53, Malawian singer-songwriter and politician, MP (2004–2006).
- Bejkush Birçe, 81, Albanian football player and coach (Dinamo City, national team).
- Manuel Cargaleiro, 97, Portuguese painter and ceramist.
- Manny Castañeda, Filipino actor (Sic O'Clock News, Makiling), director and screenwriter.
- Chiu Hin-kwong, 96, Hong Kong doctor and politician, member of the legislative council (1985–1988) and executive council (1986–1988).
- Michael Cohen, 94, American condensed matter physicist.
- Dorinda Connor, 77, American politician, member of the Delaware Senate (1997–2012), complications from Parkinson's disease.
- Jean-Pierre Descombes, 76, French television host, complications from Parkinson's disease.
- Gilbert Desmet, 93, Belgian professional cyclist.
- Carl Ferrill, 78, American college football coach (New Mexico Highlands, Los Angeles Valley College).
- Bobby Grier, 91, American college football player (Pittsburgh Panthers).
- Ion Ionescu, 88, Romanian football player (Știința București) and manager (FC Politehnica Timișoara, UTA Arad).
- Brian Kilby, 86, English Olympic long-distance runner (1960, 1964).
- Edith Taylor Langster, 75, American politician, member of the Tennessee House of Representatives (1995–2007).
- Aldo Manos, 91, Italian diplomat and environmentalist. (death announced on this date)
- Dvontaye Mitchell, 43, American victim of unlawful killing.
- Nadim Mostafa, 58, Bangladeshi politician, MP (1996–2006), heart attack.
- Ibrahim Ogohi, 75, Nigerian admiral, chief of defence staff (1999–2003).
- Maria Rosaria Omaggio, 70, Italian actress (The Cop in Blue Jeans, My Father's Private Secretary, Walesa: Man of Hope) and writer.
- Dylcia Noemi Pagan, 77, Puerto Rican political activist and convicted bomber, respiratory failure.
- Éric Poujade, 51, French gymnast, Olympic silver medalist (2000).
- Daniel Rajakoba, 83, Malagasy politician.
- Neil Primrose, 7th Earl of Rosebery, 95, British nobleman, member of the House of Lords (1974–1999).
- R. Sampanthan, 91, Sri Lankan politician, MP (1977–1983, 1997–2000, since 2001).
- Justin Shonga, 27, Zambian footballer (Orlando Pirates, Cape Town City, national team).
- Wayne Smith, 92, American diplomat and author, complications from Alzheimer's disease.
- Song Jiashu, 92, Chinese materials scientist.
- Ileana Stana-Ionescu, 87, Romanian actress and politician, deputy (2000–2004).
- John Stenton, 99, English cricketer (Somerset).
- Arno Stern, 100, German-born French pedagogue.
- Zhang Zhijie, 17, Chinese badminton player, cardiac arrest.
