= Pocoroba =

Pocoroba is a surname. Notable people with the surname include:

- Biff Pocoroba (1953–2020), American baseball player
- Mario Alberto Becerra Pocoroba (1955–2024), Mexican lawyer and politician
