= Lauper =

Lauper is a surname. Notable people with the name include:

- Cyndi Lauper (born 1953), American singer
- Erwin Lauper (born 1946), Swiss wheelchair curler
- Hubert Lauper (1944–2024), Swiss politician
- Nils Lauper (born 1982), Swiss freestyle skier
- Rolf Lauper (1960–2006), Swiss footballer
- Sandro Lauper (born 1996), Swiss footballer

== See also ==
- Claudia Lauper Bushman (born 1934), American historian
- Lauper Peak, a mountain in New Zealand
