= Descombes =

Descombes is a French language surname that may refer to:

- Charles-Maurice Descombes (1782–1869), French playwright, theatre critic and writer
- Colette Descombes, French film actress
- Émile Descombes (1829–1912), French pianist
- Eric Descombes (born 1971), Mauritanian-Cameroonian association football player and manager
- Jeanie Descombes (born 1935), American baseball player
- Jean-Pierre Descombes (1947–2024), French television host
- Philippe Descombes (born 1974), French racing driver
- Vincent Descombes (born 1943), French philosopher
- Vincent Descombes Sevoie (born 1984), French ski jumper
