= John Stenton =

English cricketer (1924–2024)

Personal information
- Full name: John Derrick Stenton
- Born: 26 October 1924; Sheffield, Yorkshire, England
- Died: 30 June 2024 (aged 99); Worthing, West Sussex, England
- Batting: Right-handed
- Bowling: Slow left-arm orthodox

Domestic team information
- Years: Team
- 1953: Somerset

Career statistics
| Competition | FC |
|---|---|
| Matches | 1 |
| Runs scored | 19 |
| Batting average | 9.50 |
| 100s/50s | 0/0 |
| Top score | 18 |
| Balls bowled | 36 |
| Wickets | 1 |
| Bowling average | 44.00 |
| 5 wickets in innings | 0 |
| 10 wickets in match | 0 |
| Best bowling | 1/18 |
| Catches/stumpings | 0/– |
- Source: CricketArchive, 22 December 2015

John Derrick Stenton (26 October 1924 – 30 June 2024) was an English cricketer who played in one first-class match for Somerset in 1953.

Stenton was born in Sheffield on 26 October 1924. He was a right-handed batsman and a slow left-arm bowler. Somerset, searching for a slow left-armer to replace Horace Hazell, who had left the staff at the end of the 1952 season, played him in the match against Surrey at the County Ground, Taunton at the end of May 1953. But his two overs in Surrey's first innings cost 26 runs, and though he took the wicket of David Fletcher in the second innings, it was not enough to keep his place in the side.

A few matches later, the 17-year-old Brian Langford, an off-spin bowler, took 14 wickets in his second match for Somerset, and opened up alternative spinning options. And John McMahon, who took five first innings wickets for Surrey in the game that Stenton appeared in, was signed by Somerset as a slow left-arm bowler for 1954. Stenton did not play first-class cricket again after this one appearance.

Stenton later lived in Brighton, where he worked as the general primary advisor to Brighton Schools. He died in Worthing on 30 June 2024, at the age of 99.

== Sources ==
- CricketArchive.com
