= Ron Simonson =

American football coach (1942–2024)

Biographical details
- Born: March 12, 1942; Portland, Oregon, U.S.
- Died: June 15, 2024 (aged 82)

Coaching career (HC unless noted)
- 1978–1984: Puget Sound
- 1985–1988: Northern Colorado
- 1989–1990: Winnipeg Blue Bombers (assistant)
- 1997–1998: Oregon State (RB)

Head coaching record
- Overall: 66–48–1
- Tournaments: 0–1 (NCAA D-II playoffs)

Accomplishments and honors

Championships
- 1 Evergreen (1983)

Ron Simonson (March 12, 1942 – June 15, 2024) was an American former gridiron football coach. He served as the head football coach at the University of Puget Sound from 1978 to 1984 and at the University of Northern Colorado from 1985 until 1988, compiling a career college football record of 66–48–1. He also held assistant coaching positions with the Winnipeg Blue Bombers of the Canadian Football League (CFL) and Oregon State.

After retiring from football he began a career as an author.

He died of Alzheimer's disease on June 15, 2024.

== Head coaching record ==
Year	Team	Overall	Conference	Standing	Bowl/playoffs
Puget Sound Loggers (NCAA Division II independent) (1978–1982)
1978	Puget Sound	9–1			
1979	Puget Sound	7–4			
1980	Puget Sound	6–3			
1981	Puget Sound	10–2			L NCAA Division II Quarterfinal
1982	Puget Sound	7–3			
Puget Sound Loggers (Evergreen Conference) (1983–1984)
1983	Puget Sound	9–1	7–0	1st	
1984	Puget Sound	5–4–1	4–3–1	4th	
Puget Sound:		53–18–1	11–3–1		
Northern Colorado Bears (North Central Conference) (1985–1988)
1985	Northern Colorado	2–9	2–7	T–8th	
1986	Northern Colorado	3–8	3–6	T–7th	
1987	Northern Colorado	3–8	2–7	9th	
1988	Northern Colorado	5–5	4–5	T–6th	
Northern Colorado:		13–30	11–25		
Total:		66–48–1			
National championship Conference title Conference division title or championship game berth
