= Vassilios Brakatsoulas =

Greek lawyer and politician (1929–2024)

- Βασίλειος Μπρακατσούλας

Member of the Hellenic Parliament for Karditsa
- In office 18 June 1989 – 24 August 1996
- In office 1958–1961

Personal details
- Born: 5 February 1929 Mouzaki, Greece
- Died: 5 June 2024 (aged 95)
- Party: EDA; Pasok
- Education: National and Kapodistrian University of Athens
- Occupation: Lawyer

Vassilios Brakatsoulas (Greek: Βασίλειος Μπρακατσούλας; 5 February 1929 – 5 June 2024) was a Greek lawyer and politician. A member of the United Democratic Left and Pasok, he served in the Hellenic Parliament from 1958 to 1961 and again from 1989 to 1996.

Brakatsoulas died on 5 June 2024, at the age of 95.
