= Jerry Hampton =

American football and wrestling coach

Biographical details
- Born: July 24, 1932; Las Vegas, Nevada, U.S.
- Died: June 2, 2024 (aged 91); Lamoni, Iowa, U.S.
- Education: Graceland (1952); William Jewell; New Mexico; Columbia

Coaching career (HC unless noted)

Football
- 1963: Graceland
- 1965–1968: Graceland

Wrestling
- 1960–1981: Graceland

Head coaching record
- Overall: 10–32–2 (football); 238–87 (wrestling duals)

Gerald Elmer Hampton (July 24, 1932 – June 2, 2024) was an American football and wrestling coach. He served as the head football coach at Graceland University in Lamoni, Iowa in 1963 and again from 1965 to 1968. He was the head wrestling coach at Graceland for 22 seasons and amassed a 238-87 record. He also coached golf, cross country, and tennis for Graceland. He retired from Graceland's physical education faculty in 2010.

== Head coaching record ==
Year	Team	Overall	Conference	Standing	Bowl/playoffs
Graceland Yellowjackets (Missouri College Athletic Union) (1963)
1963	Graceland	1–7	1–3	4th	
Graceland Yellowjackets (Missouri College Athletic Union) (1965–1968)
1965	Graceland	3–6	2–3	4th	
1966	Graceland	1–8	0–5	6th	
1967	Graceland	1–6–2	0–4–1	6th	
1968	Graceland	4–5	2–3	4th	
Graceland:		10–32–2	5–18–1		
Total:		10–32–2			
