= Ahmed Zitouni =

Algerian author (1949–2024)

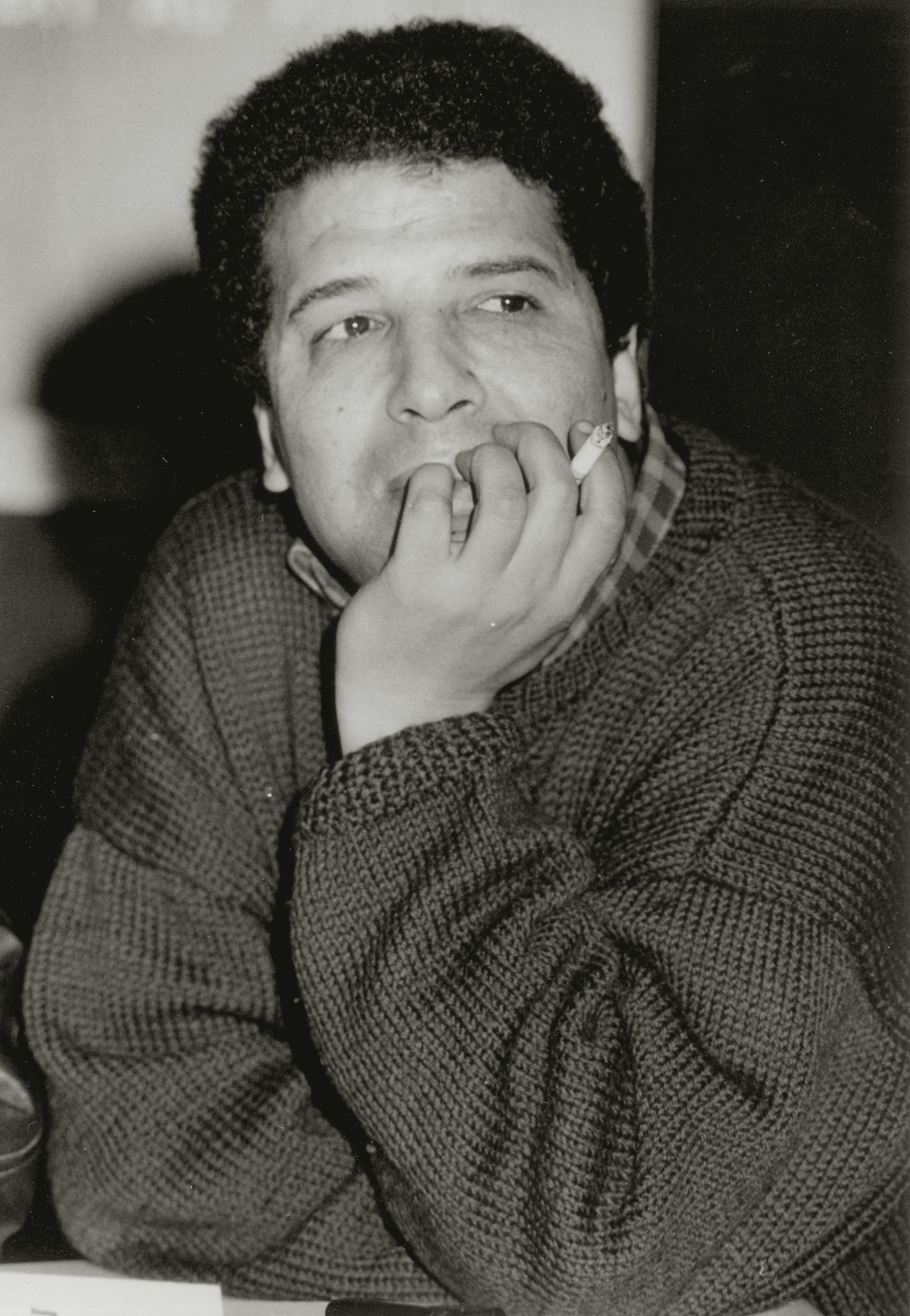
- Zitouni in March 2000.
- Born: July 1949; Saïda, French Algeria
- Died: 6 June 2024 (aged 74); France
- Education: Sciences Po Aix
- Occupation: Author

Ahmed Zitouni (July 1949 – 6 June 2024) was an Algerian francophone author.

== Biography ==
Born in Saïda in July 1949, Zitouni spent his childhood in the midst of the Algerian War. He studied in Saïda, Oran, and Algiers before moving to Marseille and beginning his writing career. He then earned a postgraduate degree from the Sciences Po Aix in political science. He then taught courses to foreign students and adults at the university, covering topics such as culture, methodology, and contemporary French civilization.

Zitouni died in France on 6 June 2024, at the age of 74.

== Publications ==
- Avec du sang déshonoré d’encre à leurs mains (1983)
- Aimez-vous Brahim ? (1986)
- Attilah Fakir (Les derniers jours d’un apostropheur) (1987)
- Éloge de la Belle-Mère (1990)
- La veuve et le pendu (1993)
- À mourir de rire, fiction française (1997)
- Une difficile fin de moi (1998)
- Amour, sévices et morgue (1998)
- Manosque, aller-retour (1998)
- Y a-t-il une vie avant la mort ? (2007)
- Au début était le mort (La corde ou le chien) (2008)
