= Trinitat Neras i Plaja =

Spanish politician (1941–2024)

Member of the Parliament of Catalonia for Girona
- In office 10 April 1980 – 23 September 2003

Personal details
- Born: 9 August 1941 Begur, Spain
- Died: 10 June 2024 (aged 82)
- Party: CDC
- Occupation: Businesswoman

Trinitat Neras i Plaja (9 August 1941 – 10 June 2024) was a Spanish politician. A member of the Democratic Convergence of Catalonia, she served in the Parliament of Catalonia from 1980 to 2003 as one of the first eight female lawmakers.

Neras died on 10 June 2024, at the age of 82.
