= Orville Frenette =

Canadian judge (1927–2024)

Deputy Judge of the Federal Court of Canada
- In office July 18, 2007 – 27 June 2024

Personal details
- Born: May 2, 1927 Fort Frances, Ontario, Canada
- Died: June 27, 2024 (aged 97)

Orville Frenette (May 2, 1927 – June 27, 2024) was a judge who served on the Federal Court of Canada. He died on June 27, 2024, at the age of 97.

== Bibliography ==
- L'incidence du décès de la victime d'un délit ou d'un quasi-délit sur l'action en indemnité, Librairie de l'Université d'Ottawa, 1961, 236 p.
- L'évaluation du préjudice en cas de blessures et en cas de décès : supplément, Hull, Québec : O. Frenette, 1973, 158 p.
- L'évaluation du préjudice en cas de blessures corporelles, de décès et de certaines atteintes aux droits fondamentaux de la personne : Supplément 2003, Librairie Wilson & Lafleur Limitee, 2003, 221 p.
