= Charoen Chaoprayun =

Thai politician (1934–2024)

- เจริญ เชาวน์ประยูร

Member of the House of Representatives of Thailand for Chiang Mai province
- In office 1979–1996

Personal details
- Born: 25 September 1934 Mueang Chiang Mai district, Siam
- Died: 3 June 2024 (aged 89)
- Party: Social Action; Justice Unity; Chart Pattana
- Education: Thammasat University; Chiang Mai University
- Occupation: Schoolteacher

Charoen Chaoprayun (also spelled Chaoprayoon, Thai: เจริญ เชาวน์ประยูร; 25 September 1934 – 3 June 2024) was a Thai politician. A member of the Social Action Party, the Justice Unity Party, and the Chart Pattana Party, he served in the House of Representatives from 1979 to 1996.

Chaoprayun died on 3 June 2024, at the age of 89.
