= George L. Bakris =

Greek American physician (1952–2024)

- Born: June 15, 1952; Athens, Greece
- Died: June 15, 2024 (aged 72)

George L. Bakris (June 15, 1952 – June 15, 2024) was a Greek American physician and professor of medicine, specialising in kidney disease and hypertension.

He published more than 1100 journal articles and had an h-index of 135. He worked on research into both therapies and drugs for the control of hypertension, and contributed to new guidelines for its treatment in the United States.

== Early life and education ==
Bakris was born in Athens, Greece, on June 15, 1952. He arrived in the United States at six weeks of age and grew up in South Bend, Indiana, in a Greek Orthodox household. He attended the Howe Military Academy. He completed a bachelor's degree in biology and psychology at Indiana University Bloomington in 1974, and then studied medicine at the University of Athens and at the Rosalind Franklin University in Chicago.

== Career ==
From 1988 to 1991, he served as director of renal research at the Ochsner Medical Center and had faculty appointments in the Departments of Medicine and Physiology at Tulane University School of Medicine. From 1993 until 2006 he was professor, vice chairman of the Department of Preventive Medicine and director of the Hypertension/Clinical Research Centre of Rush University in Chicago. From 2007 to 2024, he served as professor of medicine and director of the AHA Comprehensive Hypertension Centre in the Department of Medicine at the University of Chicago Medicine.
