= Beksultan Tutkushev =

Kazakh politician (1948–2024)

Beksūltan Tūtqyşev
- Бексұлтан Тұтқышев

Member of the Senate of Kazakhstan
- In office December 1995 – December 2008

Personal details
- Born: 19 August 1948 Kostanay, Kostanay Region, Kazakh SSR, USSR
- Died: 7 June 2024 (aged 75) Astana, Kazakhstan
- Party: Nur Otan
- Education: Karaganda State Medical Institute
- Occupation: Surgeon

Beksūltan Serıkbaiūly Tūtqyşev (Note: Often transliterated as Beksultan Serikpaevich Tutkushev through a Russified Romanization of Бексултан Серикпаевич Туткушев.) (Kazakh: Бексұлтан Серікбайұлы Тұтқышев; 19 August 1948 – 7 June 2024) was a Kazakh politician. A member of Nur Otan, he served in the Senate from 1995 to 2008.

Tūtqyşev died in Astana on 7 June 2024, at the age of 75.
