= Allan Mueller =

American politician

Member of the U.S. House of Representatives from Missouri's 62nd district

Missouri House of Representatives

Personal details
- Born: 1942 St. Louis, Missouri
- Died: 2024 (aged 81–82) Lake of the Ozarks
- Resting place: Resurrection Cemetery in Jefferson City, Missouri
- Party: Democratic
- Spouse: Carol Coleman
- Children: 4
- Occupation: combat engineer

Allan G. "Al" Mueller (December 16, 1942 - June 11, 2024) was a Democratic politician who served 8 years in the Missouri House of Representatives, 6 years in the state senate, 13 years as public service commissioner, and 12 years as Cole County treasurer. He was born in St. Louis, Missouri, and was educated in St. Engelbert's Elementary, McBride High School, and St. Mary's University in San Antonio, Texas. On November 10, 1973, Mueller married Carol Coleman at St. Louis University. He served in the U.S. Marine Corps between 1965 and 1969 and worked as a combat engineer during the Vietnam War, reaching the rank of captain. Mueller died in a drowning accident at Lake of the Ozarks in 2024 at the age of 81.
