= Luigi Saraceni =

Italian magistrate, lawyer, and politician (1937–2024)

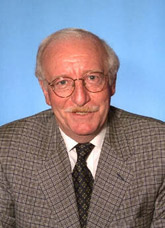
- Luigi Saraceni

Member of the Chamber of Deputies of Italy for Campania 23
- In office 21 April 1994 – 29 May 2001

Personal details
- Born: 8 August 1937 Castrovillari, Italy
- Died: 2 June 2024 (aged 86) Rome, Italy
- Party: DS
- Occupation: Magistrate; Lawyer

Luigi Saraceni (8 August 1937 – 2 June 2024) was an Italian magistrate, lawyer, and politician. A member of the Democrats of the Left, he served in the Chamber of Deputies from 1994 to 2001.

Saraceni died in Rome on 2 June 2024, at the age of 86.
