= Anton van Dalen =

Dutch-American artist (1938–2024)

Anton van Dalen (July 13, 1938 – June 25, 2024) was a Dutch-born American artist known for his paintings of the East Village of New York City. Born in Amstelveen, Netherlands, he emigrated, first with his family to Toronto in 1954, then to Brooklyn in 1966. He was an assistant to the artist Saul Steinberg for 30 years. He lived on Manhattan's Lower East Side from the late 1960s until his death there on June 25, 2024.
