= Raffaele Aurisicchio =

Italian trade unionist and politician (1953–2024)

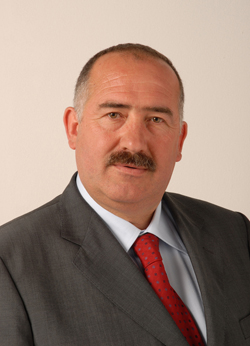
- Aurisicchio in 2006

Member of the Chamber of Deputies of Italy for Campania 2
- In office 28 April 2006 – 28 April 2008

Personal details
- Born: 12 December 1953 Santa Paolina, Italy
- Died: 1 June 2024 (aged 70) Santa Paolina, Italy
- Party: DS (1999–2007); SD (2007–2009); SEL (2009–2017); SI (2017–2024)
- Occupation: Trade unionist

Raffaele Aurisicchio (12 December 1953 – 1 June 2024) was an Italian trade unionist and politician. A member of the Democrats of the Left and the Democratic Left, he served in the Chamber of Deputies from 2006 to 2008.

Aurisicchio died in Santa Paolina on 1 June 2024, at the age of 70.
