= Regina Gordilho =

Brazilian politician (1933–2024)

Member of the Chamber of Deputies of Brazil for Rio de Janeiro
- In office 1 February 1991 – 31 January 1995

Personal details
- Born: Regina Helena Costa Gordilho; 12 May 1933 Salvador, Bahia, Brazil
- Died: 7 June 2024 (aged 91) Rio de Janeiro, Brazil
- Party: PDT (1980–1992); PRP (1992); PRONA (1992–1996)
- Occupation: Businesswoman

Regina Helena Costa Gordilho (12 May 1933 – 7 June 2024) was a Brazilian politician. A member of the Democratic Labour Party, the Progressive Republican Party, and the Party of the Reconstruction of the National Order, she served in the Chamber of Deputies from 1991 to 1995.

Gordilho died in Rio de Janeiro on 7 June 2024, at the age of 91.
