= Theo Fischer =

Swiss politician (1930–2024)

Member of the Swiss National Council
- In office 14 March 1983 – 3 December 1995

Personal details
- Born: 15 February 1930 Triengen, Lucerne, Switzerland
- Died: 14 June 2024 (aged 94)
- Party: CVP
- Occupation: Lawyer

Theo Fischer (15 February 1930 – 14 June 2024) was a Swiss politician. A member of the Christian Democratic People's Party, he served in the National Council from 1983 to 1995.

Fischer died on 14 June 2024, at the age of 94.
