= Dmitri Yafaev =

Russian-French mathematical physicist (1948–2024)

Dmitri R. Yafaev (Дмитрий Рауэльевич Яфаев; 2 January 1948 – 16 June 2024) was a Russian-French mathematical physicist.

At the University of Leningrad (now renamed Saint Petersburg State University) Yafaev received his Russian Candidate degree (Ph.D.) in 1973 with thesis advisor Mikhail Birman and was a lecturer from 1973 to 1977. From 1977 to 1990 Yafaev was a researcher and senior researcher at the St. Petersburg Branch of the Steklov Institute of Mathematics. At the University of Nantes he was an associate professor from 1990 to 1992. From 1992 he was a full professor at the University of Rennes 1.

Yafaev's research deals with "spectral theory of differential operators; spectral properties of scattering matrices; long-range scattering theory; magnetic Hamiltonians". He is the author of three books and numerous articles. He was on the editorial boards of several journals, including Integral Equations and Operator Theory.

He was an invited speaker in 1998 of the International Congress of Mathematicians in Berlin and in 2003 at the 14th International Congress on Mathematical Physics in Lisbon.

Yafaev died on 16 June 2024, at the age of 76.

== Selected publications ==
=== Articles ===
- Yafaev, D. R. (1982). "The low energy scattering for slowly decreasing potentials". Communications in Mathematical Physics. 85 (2): 177–196. Bibcode:1982CMaPh..85..177Y. doi:10.1007/BF01254456. S2CID 123104322.
- Yafaev, D. R. (1984). "Scattering theory for time-dependent zero-range potentials" (PDF). Annales de l'Institut Henri Poincaré A. 40 (4): 343–359.
- Sobolev, Alexander V.; Yafaev, D. R. (1986). "On the quasi-classical limit of the total scattering cross-section in nonrelativistic quantum mechanics" (PDF). Annales de l'Institut Henri Poincaré A. 44 (2): 195–210.
- Yafaev, D. R. (1986). "The eikonal approximation and the asymptotics of the total scattering cross-section for the Schrödinger equation" (PDF). Annales de l'Institut Henri Poincaré A. 44 (4): 397–425.
- Yafaev, D. (1993). "Radiation conditions and scattering theory for N-particle Hamiltonians". Communications in Mathematical Physics. 154 (3): 523–554. Bibcode:1993CMaPh.154..523Y. doi:10.1007/BF02102107. S2CID 120460647.
- Yafaev, D. (1998). "The Scattering Amplitude for the Schrödinger Equation with a Long-Range Potential". Communications in Mathematical Physics. 191 (1): 183–218. Bibcode:1998CMaPh.191..183Y. doi:10.1007/s002200050265. S2CID 119681527.
- Yafaev, Dimitri (1999). "Sharp constants in the Hardy–Rellich inequalities" (PDF). Journal of Functional Analysis. 168 (1): 121–144. doi:10.1006/jfan.1999.3462.
- Roux, Ph.; Yafaev, D. (2003). "The scattering matrix for the Schrödinger operator with a long-range electromagnetic potential". Journal of Mathematical Physics. 44 (7): 2762. Bibcode:2003JMP....44.2762R. doi:10.1063/1.1576494.

=== Books ===
- Mathematical Scattering Theory: General Theory. Translation of Mathematical Monographs, vol. 105. Providence, Rhode Island: AMS. 1992. ISBN 0-8218-4558-6; x+341 pp.; pbk
- Scattering Theory: Some Old and New Problems. Lecture Notes in Mathematics, vol. 1735. Springer-Verlag. 2000. ISBN 3-540-67587-6; 176 pp.; pbk
- Mathematical Scattering Theory: Analytic Theory. Mathematical Surveys and Monographs, vol. 158. Providence, Rhode Island: AMS. 2010. ISBN 978-0-8218-0331-8; 444 pp.; hbk
