= Halina Bortnowska =

Polish activist (1931–2024)

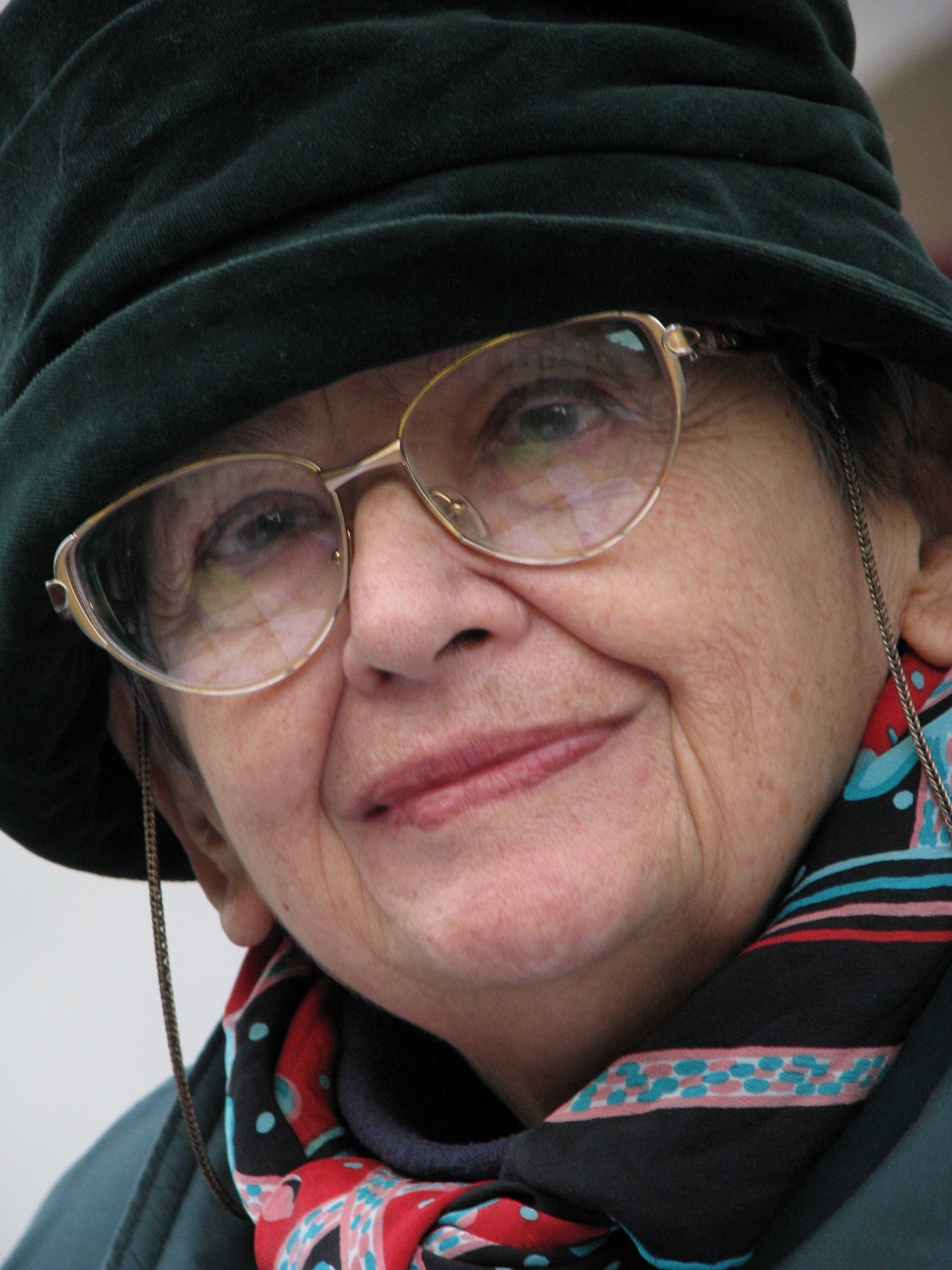
Bortnowska in 2010

Halina Bortnowska (23 September 1931 – 19 June 2024) was a Polish social and ecumenical activist, and publicist. She was born in Toruń on 23 September 1931, and died on 19 June 2024, at the age of 92.
