= Standish Meacham =

American historian

- Born: Standish Meacham Jr. March 12, 1932; Cincinnati, Ohio, U.S.
- Died: June 13, 2024 (aged 92); South Portland, Maine, U.S.
- Education: Yale University; Harvard University
- Occupation: Historian

Standish Meacham Jr. (March 12, 1932 – June 13, 2024) was an American historian.

== Life and career ==
Meacham was born in Cincinnati, Ohio, the son of Standish Meacham Sr. and Eleanor Rapp. He attended Yale University, graduating in 1954. After graduating, he served as a lieutenant in the United States Army, which after his discharge, he attended Harvard University, earning his PhD degree in British history in 1961.

Meacham served as a professor in the department of history at the University of Texas at Austin from 1970 to 1972 and again from 1984 to 1988. During his years as a professor, in 1986, he was named the Sheffield Centennial Professor by the University of Texas System Board of Regents.

== Death ==
Meacham died on June 13, 2024, in South Portland, Maine, at the age of 92.
