= Park Yang-soo =

South Korean politician (1938–2024)

- 박양수

Member of the National Assembly of South Korea
- In office 30 May 2000 – 29 May 2004

Personal details
- Born: 5 January 1938 Jindo County, Korea, Empire of Japan
- Died: 10 June 2024 (aged 86)
- Party: MDP
- Education: Chung-Ang University

Park Yang-soo (Korean: 박양수; 5 January 1938 – 10 June 2024) was a South Korean politician. A member of the Millennium Democratic Party, he served in the National Assembly from 2000 to 2004.

Park died on 10 June 2024, at the age of 86.
