= Marc Ambroise-Rendu =

French journalist (1929–2024)

Marc Ambroise-Rendu (20 December 1929 – 24 June 2024) was a French journalist. He was the honorary president of the Île-de-France chapter of France Nature Environnement (FNE IdF) and the editor-in-chief of Liaison, the monthly publication of FNE IdF. He studied at the École supérieure de journalisme de Lille in Lille.

According to Le Monde, the newspaper for which he worked from 1974 to 1995, he was one of the first journalists to take an interest in ecology. Concerned by environmental issues, he launched a dedicated column upon his arrival.

The candidacy of René Dumont, an environmental activist during the 1974 presidential election, strengthened his position at the newspaper. "The appearance of the agronomist who wore the colours of ecology finally convinced Jacques Fauvet, Hubert Beuve-Méry's successor, of the importance of this new field of news," wrote Le Monde. "Ambroise-Rendu was responsible for defining the terms: equal parts, to feed the articles, between the information provided by the associations and that of the institutions."

Ambroise-Rendu died on 24 June 2024, at the age of 94.
