= Barbara Repetto =

Italian politician (1947–2024)

Member of the Landtag of South Tyrol
- In office 18 November 2008 – 21 January 2010

Personal details
- Born: 16 May 1947 Bolzano, Italy
- Died: 9 June 2024 (aged 77) Milan, Italy
- Party: PD
- Education: University of Bologna
- Occupation: Civil servant

Barbara Repetto (16 May 1947 – 9 June 2024) was an Italian politician. A member of the Democratic Party, she served in the Landtag of South Tyrol from 2008 to 2010.

Repetto died in Milan on 9 June 2024, at the age of 77.
