= Torsten Stein =

- Born: 31 December 1944; Potsdam, Germany
- Died: 21 June 2024 (aged 79); Heidelberg, Germany

Torsten Stein (31 December 1944 – 21 June 2024) was a German jurist. He was the holder of the Chair of European Law and European Public Law at Saarland University as well as the Director of the Europa-Institut, Law Department of Saarland University from 1991 to 2012.

== Career ==
Torsten Stein served in the German Military from 1964-66. He was a reserve Officer with the rank of Colonel. From 1966-1970, he studied law at the Ruprecht-Karls-Universität Heidelberg and the Freie Universität zu Berlin. He obtained his doctorate in 1974, the subject of his dissertation having been "Administrative Cooperation in Foreign Affairs". Torsten Stein subsequently joined the Max Planck Institute for Foreign Public and International Law in Heidelberg as a researcher. He was appointed professor at the University of Heidelberg in 1986, after gaining his postdoctoral lecture qualification ("The Political Offence Exception to Extradition: Normative Limits, Practical Application and an Attempt at Re-Formulation") in 1983, while simultaneously continuing his work at the Max Planck Institute. He was the holder of the Chair of European Law and European Public Law at Saarland University as well as the Director of the Europa-Institut, Law Department of Saarland University from 1991 to 2012.

== Research interests ==
- Institutional European Law
- Common Foreign, Security and Defense Policy of the EU
- Prohibition of the use of force, self-defense and peacekeeping under International Law
- International Humanitarian Law
- International Court of Justice

== Co-Editorships ==
- Journal for European Studies ("Zeitschrift für Europarechtliche Studien" (ZEuS)
- "Schriften des Europa-Instituts der Universität des Saarlandes"
- "Saarbrücker Studien zum Internationalen Recht"

== Memberships ==
Professor Stein was managing director and commentator for the International Committee of the International Law Association, he was chairman of the German branch of the International Law Association as well as honorary treasurer and member of the Executive Council of the International Law Association. He was a member of numerous national, foreign and international legal societies and director of the incorporated association "Friends of Saarland University" as well as chairman of the Hermann and Dr. Charlotte Deutsch Foundation. Moreover, he was chairman of the Heidelberg Society for Comparative Public Law and International Law (Gesellschaft für ausländisches öffentliches Recht und Völkerrecht e.V.), a member of the Board of Trustees at the Academy of European Law in Trier (ERA) and of the Academy council at the European Academy of Otzenhausen.
