= Hermann Amborn =

German ethnologist (1933–2024)

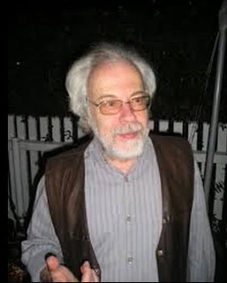
- Born: 11 April 1933; Braubach, Germany
- Died: 18 June 2024 (aged 91); Munich, Germany

Academic background
- Education: Munich Institute of Ethnology
- Thesis: The Importance of the cultures of the Nile Valley for iron production in sub-Saharan Africa (Die Bedeutung der Kulturen des Niltals für die Eisenproduktion im subsaharischen Afrika) (1973)
- Doctoral advisor: Hermann Baumann and Helmut Straube

Academic work
- Institutions: Ludwig-Maximilians-Universität München
- Main interests: Anthropology, African society and politics.
- Website: https://www.ethnologie.uni-muenchen.de/personen/emeriti/amborn/index.html

Hermann Amborn (11 April 1933 – 18 June 2024) was a German anthropologist and ethnologist. With a regional focus on northern and eastern Africa, Amborn's research addressed the political organisation of society, the division of labour, agricultural ethnology, and ethics in applied anthropological research.

== Life and career ==
Amborn's father was a pastor who opposed the Nazi regime. As a young man, Amborn initially trained as a technical draftsman and engineer before changing fields. Amborn held visiting professorships in Hamburg and Berlin in addition to Kansas State University. He became a full professor at Ludwig-Maximilians-Universität München in 1987, where he was made professor emeritus on retirement in 1998. From 1991 to 2001, Amborn was the ethics working group spokesperson for the German Anthropological Association (formerly Deutsche Gesellschaft für Völkerkunde, now: Deutsche Gesellschaft für Sozial- und Kulturanthropologie).

Amborn notably contributed to the study and discussion of African communities which self-govern outside of a statist framework through anti-hierarchical structures, without reliance on violent coercion in enforcing their rules and laws, and in line with anarchist principles. Mark Bray describes Amborn's work as "challenging the inevitability of the state as the "natural" outcome of societal evolution"

Amborn died in Munich on 18 June 2024, at the age of 91.

== Selected works ==
- Die Bedeutung der Kulturen des Niltals für die Eisenproduktion im subsaharischen Afrika. (Dissertation) Studien zur Kulturkunde. Frobenius-Institut, Frankfurt 1976, ISBN 3515024115
- Differenzierung und Integration. Vergleichende Untersuchungen zu Spezialisten und Handwerkern in südäthiopischen Agrargesellschaften. (Habilitationsschrift) Trickster, München 1990
- Unbequeme Ethik. Überlegungen zu einer verantwortlichen Ethnologie. Reimer, Berlin 1993, ISBN 3496025239
- Flexibel aus Tradition / Burji in Äthiopien und Kenia: Unter Verwendung der Aufzeichnungen von Helmut Straube / With explanation of some cultural items in English. Harrassowitz, Wiesbaden 2009, ISBN 3447060832
- Das Recht als Hort der Anarchie. Gesellschaften ohne Herrschaft und Staat. Matthes & Seitz, Berlin 2016, ISBN 978-3-95757-240-0. Materialien vom Autor dazu online
- 'Concepts in Wood and Stone - Socio-religious Monuments of the Konso of Southern Ethiopia', Zeitschrift für Ethnologi, 2002.
- Burji: Versatile by Tradition in Changing Identifications and Alliances in North-East Africa, Volume 1 edited by Günther Schlee and Elizabeth E. Watson. Berghahn Books, 2009.
- Mobility, Knowledge and Power: Craftsmen in the Borderland in Changing Identifications and Alliances in North-East Africa, Volume 1 edited by Günther Schlee and Elizabeth E. Watson. Berghahn Books, 2009.
- Law as Refuge of Anarchy: Societies without Hegemony or State. Untimely Meditations, MIT Press, Cambridge, MA, 2019.
