= Marc Laviolette (trade unionist) =

Canadian trade unionist (died 2024)

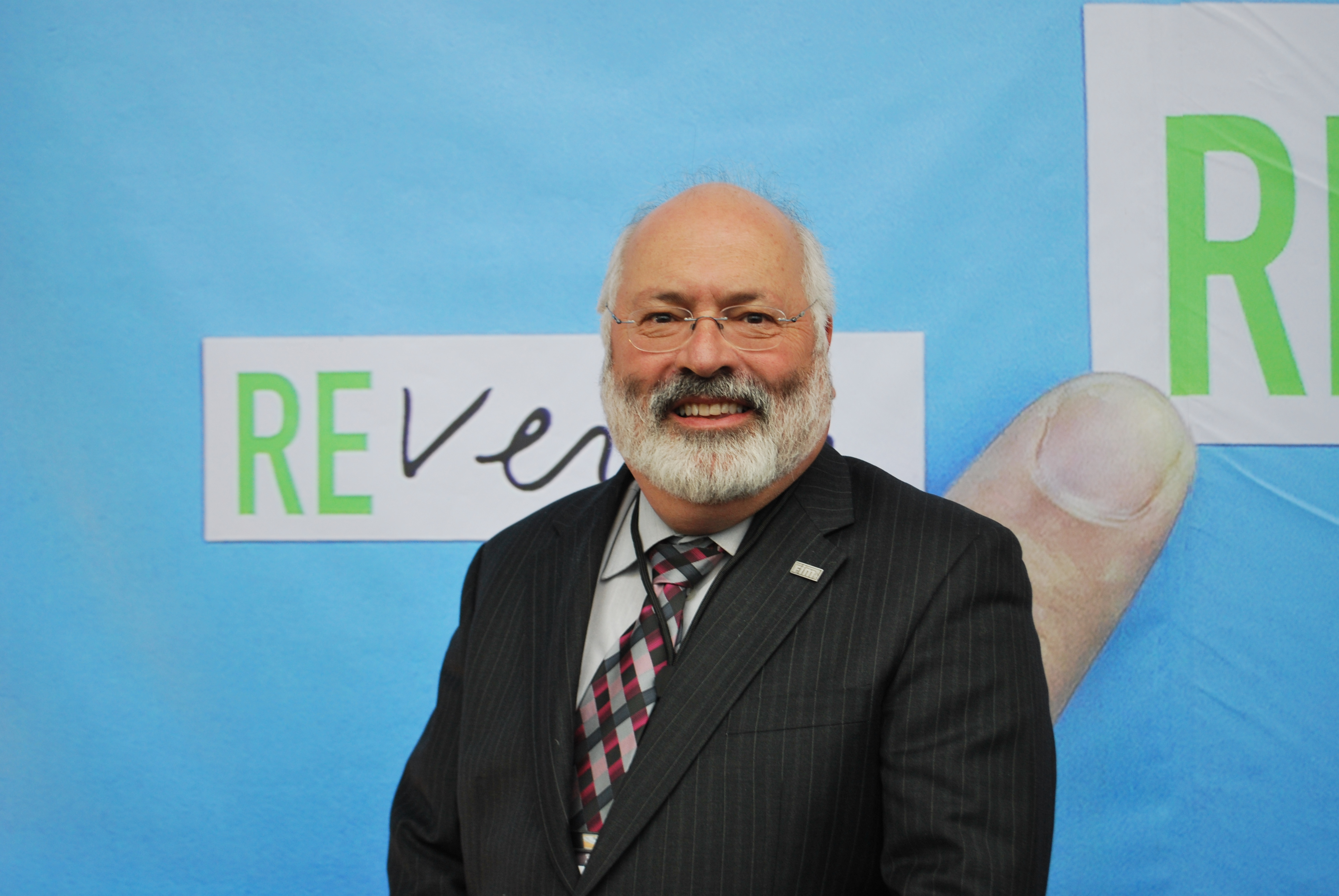
- Laviolette in 2011

President of the Confédération des syndicats nationaux
- In office 1999–2002
- Preceded by: Gérald Larose
- Succeeded by: Claudette Carbonneau

President of the SPQ Libre

Personal details
- Died: 27 June 2024
- Party: PQ; PCO
- Occupation: Trade unionist

Marc Laviolette (died 27 June 2024) was a Canadian trade unionist. He served as president of the Confédération des syndicats nationaux (CSN) from 1999 to 2002. In 2007, he joined SPQ Libre, a political organization affiliated with the Parti Québécois (PQ).

== Biography ==
Laviolette served as vice-president of the Fédération de la métallurgie before serving as president of the Syndicat des travailleurs et travailleuses des Produits chimiques Expro de Salaberry-de-Valleyfield from 1986 to 1994. In 1999, he succeeded Gérald Larose as president of the CSN until his replacement by Claudette Carbonneau in 2002. On 16 February 2007, he announced his candidacy in the National Assembly of Quebec constituency of Soulanges with the PQ, although he finished behind incumbent Liberal Lucie Charlebois. Later, he became president of SPQ Libre.

Laviolette died on 27 June 2024.
