= Jeanne Rose =

American herbalist (1937–2024)

Jeanne Rose (January 9, 1937 – June 15, 2024) was an herbalist and aromatherapist who changed the practice of American herbalism when she began her public work in 1969 with the publication of her first book, Herbs & Things: Jeanne Rose's Herbal. She began her herbal career in California as an undergraduate with studies in botany and science and a degree from San Jose State College. She went on to graduate work in marine biology and ecology. In 1969, she wrote the first modern book of herbalism, Herbs & Things. She taught herbs and aromatherapy at the University of California Extension throughout the 1970s and privately throughout the United States. She lived in San Francisco since 1967 and established a herbal/aromatic garden and study center. Becoming concerned about the environment and the production of aromatic plants, she organized the aromatherapy industry and a group, The Aromatic Plant Project, to support local and organic production of aromatic plants, to provide resources for growers and distillers, to ensure high quality aromatherapy products and to educate consumers as to the appropriate and beneficial uses of these aromatic products.

Rose is the author of over 20 books, including Herbs & Things, The Herbal Body Book, The Aromatherapy Book and Jeanne Rose's Herbal Guide to Food, and she taught herbs, aromatherapy and distillation extensively throughout the US. She organized and was president of the first large aromatherapy organization in the United States, NAHA, and spoke widely at many other events and conferences. She taught distillation techniques for quality essential oils in various parts of the world. The word, "hydrosol" as used for the waters of distillation, was first used and put in place by Jeanne Rose in 1990.

Jeanne Rose died on June 15, 2024.

== Works ==
- Herbs & Things: Jeanne Rose's Herbal, Perigee Books 1972, Last Gasp 2001 ISBN 0-448-02457-8
- The Herbal Body Book. Frog, Ltd. 2000. ISBN 1-58394-004-9.
- The Herbal Guide to Food. North Atlantic Books. 1989. ISBN 1-55643-056-6.
- Ask Jeanne Rose. Keats Publications. 1984. ISBN 0-87983-315-7.
- Kitchen Cosmetics. North Atlantic Books. 1990 [1978]. ISBN 1-55643-101-5.
- The Modern Herbal. Perigee Books. 1987. ISBN 0-399-51394-9.
- Herbal Studies Course in Three Parts. Institute of Aromatic & Herbal Studies. 2007 [1988]. ISBN 978-0-9620838-1-5.
- Part 1 - Seasonal Herbal: A Reverence for Nature. Institute of Aromatic & Herbal Studies. 2007 [1988]. ISBN 978-0-9620838-2-2.
- Part 2 - Medicinal Herbal: Caring for the Body with Herbs. Institute of Aromatic & Herbal Studies. 2007 [1988]. ISBN 978-0-9620838-3-9.
- Part 3 - Reference Herbal: From History to Aromatherapy to Garden to Materia Medica. Institute of Aromatic & Herbal Studies. 2007 [1988]. ISBN 978-0-9620838-4-6.
- The Aromatherapy Book:; Applications & Inhalations. North Atlantic Books. 1992. ISBN 1-55643-073-6.
- Aromatherapy Studies Course. Institute of Aromatic & Herbal Studies. 2007 [1994].
- The World of Aromatherapy. Frog, Ltd. 1996. ISBN 1-883319-49-8.
- Herbs & AT for the Sex Organs. Frog, Ltd. 1994. ISBN 1-883319-17-X.
- 375 Essential Oils & Hydrosols. Frog, Ltd., 1999). August 24, 1999. ISBN 1-883319-89-7.
- Herbal Body Book II. Frog, Ltd. 2000. ISBN 1-879687-04-6.
- The Natural Formula Book for Home & Yard. Rodale Press. 1982. ISBN 0-87857-399-2.
- Women's Health Care, A Guide to Alternatives. Reston Publishing Co. 1984. ISBN 0-8359-8780-9.
- Aromatherapy — 21st Century: Aromatherapy Course - Home & Family. Institute of Aromatic & Herbal Studies. 2007 [2005].
- Blending Essential Oils. Institute of Aromatic & Herbal Studies. 2007 [2000].
- Distillation, A Workbook. Institute of Aromatic & Herbal Studies. 2007 [2000].
- Lavender, Lavender, Lavender. Sequim Lavender Growers Association. 2003.
- Advanced Perfumery Workbook. Institute of Aromatic & Herbal Studies. 2007.
- Hydrosols & Aromatic Waters. Institute of Aromatic & Herbal Studies. 2007.
- SPA/SKIN Workbook. Institute of Aromatic & Herbal Studies. 2007 [2003].
- Ritual works!. Institute of Aromatic & Herbal Studies. 2007.
