= Dicoh Mariam =

Ivorian chemist (1944–2024)

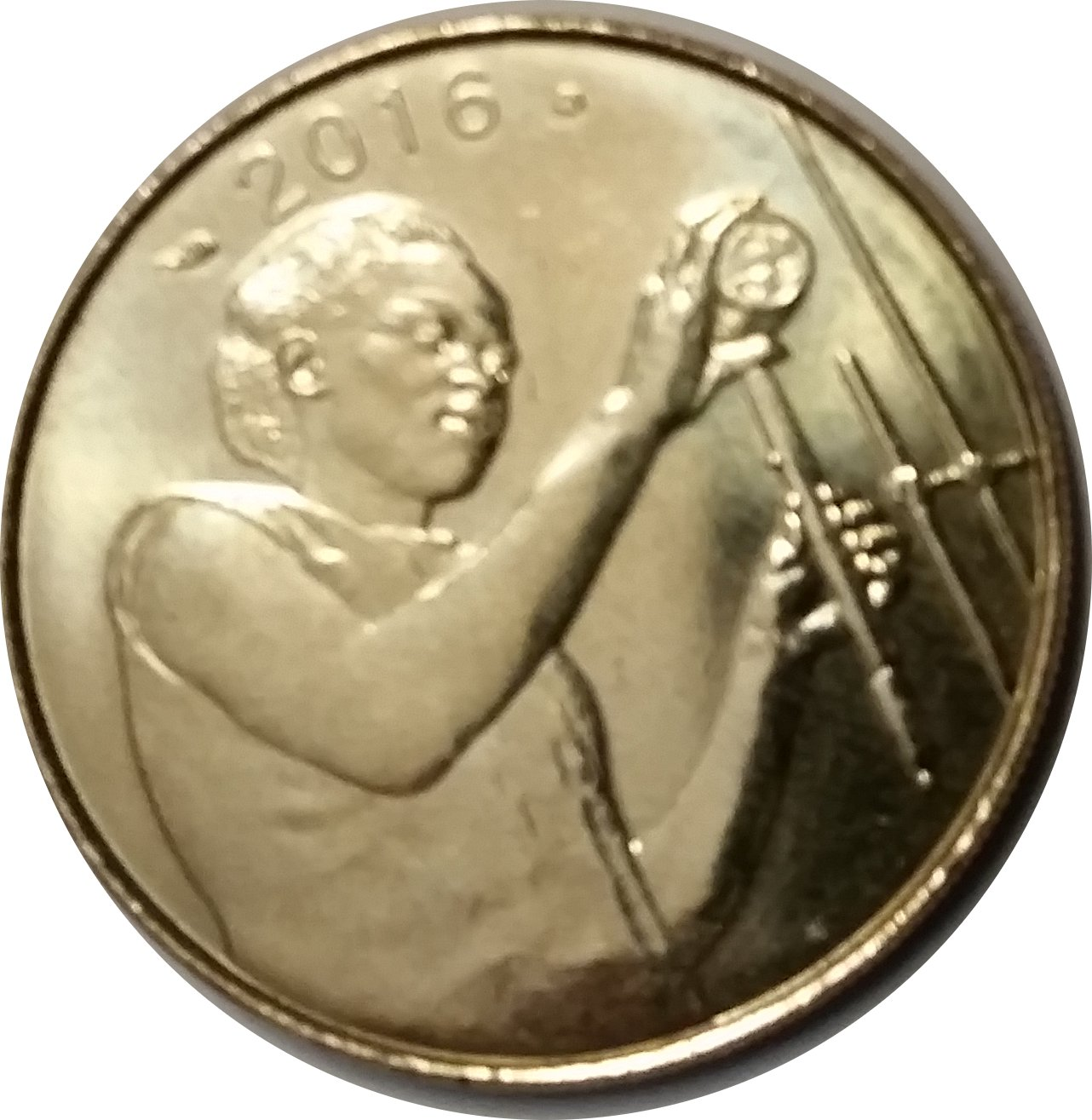
- Born: 1944; Abidjan, Colony of Côte d'Ivoire, French West Africa
- Died: 5 June 2024 (aged 79–80)
- Occupation: Chemist

Dicoh Mariam (1944 – 5 June 2024) was an Ivorian chemist. She was the first woman chemist in the Ivory Coast, and her image is found on the 25 CFA franc coin holding a burette.

== Biography ==
Born in Abidjan in 1944, Mariam earned her Certificat d'études primaires in the early 1960s. She decided to continue her secondary studies during a time in which most women did not complete their studies to become midwives or secretaries. She was one of only two women in her secondary school classes and enjoyed the support of her parents in getting through her studies.

Mariam appeared on Guillaume Soro's YouTube channel and explained the origin of the photograph that got her engraved on the 25 CFA franc coin. One of her friends took the photo in Mariam's laboratory, which appeared in the magazine 10 ans de progrès après l’indépendance in the 1970s. The photograph then coincidentally ended up in the hands of the Central Bank of West African States. Her friend Léonard Kalmogo, who was Minister of Finance of Upper Volta, then called her to inform her of the image appearing on the coin.

Mariam also became owner of a restaurant called Gorge d'Or. Until 2015, she had not received any compensation from the Central Bank of West African States. One of her sons, Jean-Luc Konan, became director-general of the United Bank for Africa for Senegal for three years.

Mariam died on 5 June 2024.

== See also ==
- Ivory Coast
- CFA franc
- Central Bank of West African States
