= James E. Paschall =

United States Air Force general (1923–2024)

- Born: March 31, 1923; LaGrange, North Carolina, U.S.
- Died: June 17, 2024 (aged 101) Eugene, Oregon, U.S.
- Allegiance: United States of America
- Branch: United States Air Force
- Service years: 1946–1976
- Rank: Major general
- Commands: Vice commander, Aerospace Defense Command
- Conflicts: World War II

James Ernest Paschall (March 31, 1923 – June 17, 2024) was a United States Air Force major general who served as vice commander of the Aerospace Defense Command. Born in LaGrange, North Carolina on March 31, 1923, Paschall died in Eugene, Oregon on June 17, 2024, at the age of 101.
