= Alfred Teschl =

Austrian politician (1924–2024)

Member of the National Council of Austria
- In office 31 March 1970 – 16 December 1986

Personal details
- Born: 31 December 1924 Judenburg, Styria, Austria
- Died: 22 June 2024 (aged 99) Vienna, Austria
- Party: SPÖ
- Occupation: Trade unionist

Alfred Teschl (31 December 1924 – 22 June 2024) was an Austrian politician. A member of the Social Democratic Party, he served in the National Council from 1970 to 1986.

Teschl died in Vienna on 22 June 2024, at the age of 99.
