= Dennis Must =

American writer (1934–2024)

Dennis Patrick Must (May 4, 1934 – June 18, 2024) was an American writer of literary fiction and plays, and an educator.

== Biography ==
Born in New Castle, Pennsylvania, Must graduated from Washington & Jefferson College in 1956. He subsequently pursued graduate studies at Princeton Theological Seminary and engaged in playwriting at the Iowa Writers' Workshop and New York University.

Growing up in a mill town in the years following the Great Depression provided the rich images, characters, and experiences that fueled and populated his writing. Early in his career, Must taught secondary school in Pittsburgh, Pennsylvania, and New York City where his deep love of books, and the process of writing them inspired a generation of students, many of whom ultimately made the arts their vocation or avocation. During the 1960s and 1970s, a time of great experimentation in the theater, he wrote, directed, and co-produced several off-off-Broadway plays in collaboration with artist John Hawkins.

In the 1990s, Must refocused on his writing, producing a body of work that included five novels, three short story collections, and numerous pieces published in literary journals and anthologies. Several of his books include evocative monoprints by Russ Spitkovsky. Must's writing is noted for its lyricism, vivid imagery, and strong sense of time and place. His contributions to literature have been recognized with numerous prestiigous awards.

Must died at the age of 90 at his home in Salem, Massachusetts.

== Books ==
- Circling Toward Nightfall, Red Hen Press, 2025 ISBN 9781636282862
- MacLeish Sq., Red Hen Press, 2022 ISBN 978-1636280592
- Banjo Grease: Selected Stories, Red Hen Press — Pasadena, CA, November, 2019 ISBN 9781597090353
- Brother Carnival, Red Hen Press, Pasadena, CA — September, 2018 ISBN 978-1597096843
- Going Dark: Selected Stories, Coffeetown Press, Seattle, WA, Fall 2016 ISBN 978-1603813976
- Hush Now, Don't Explain, Coffeetown Press, Seattle, WA, Fall 2014
- The World's Smallest Bible, Red Hen Press, Pasadena, CA, Spring 2014
- Oh Don't Ask Why, Stories by Dennis Must, Red Hen Press, Los Angeles, CA, 2007 ISBN 978-1597090582
- Banjo Grease: Selected Stories, Creative Arts Book Company, Berkeley, CA, Spring 2000 ISBN 978-0887393259
