= Kaz Hosaka =

Japanese-American dog breeder, trainer, and handler (1958–2024)

Kazuhiko "Kaz" Hosaka (November 22, 1958 – June 23, 2024) was a Japanese-American dog breeder, trainer, and handler. Two of his miniature poodles won Best in Show at the Westminster Kennel Club Dog Show. Hosaka died on June 23, 2024, at the age of 65.

== Early life ==
Kazuhiko Hosaka was born on November 22, 1958, in Kamakura, Japan. His father, Kazuhito, was an executive at a manufacturing company; his mother, Teruyko, was a homemaker. Hosaka was their only child. When Hosaka was ten, his mother died. His father gave him two dogs, a Cocker Spaniel and a dachshund, to provide companionship and comfort. These were not the only dogs in the family; Hosaka's uncle owned a successful kennel that showed working and sporting dog breeds, especially Dobermanns. When he was eleven, his uncle offered him a summer job as a kennel helper and general assistant.

== Career ==
Hosaka's career as a dog handler began when his uncle persuaded him to show a Dobermann puppy from his kennel. With Hosaka as its handler, the puppy won seven Puppy Best In Show awards in a row. Although Hosaka had initially planned to go to college and make a career as a football player, this streak of wins convinced him to continue showing dogs competitively rather than going to college.

In 1979, Hosaka was assisting his uncle at a Japanese show when he caught the attention of Anne Rogers Clark, a well-known and highly regarded judge who had been invited to judge the show. Rogers Clark had been a mentor to "some of the greatest names in the sport" and now offered Hosaka an apprenticeship. Although Hosaka initially refused the offer, his uncle overruled him. Hosaka moved to America to apprentice under Rogers Clark. His goal was to win Best in Show at the Westminster Kennel Club Dog Show, "the highest distinction in American dog competition". He showed a dog at Westminster that year, and every year from then on until his retirement in 2024.

Hosaka won his first Best in Show in May 1982, with the first dog he'd trained, groomed and showed by himself. He began to show dogs he owned in 1984, and took his first win at Westminster in 1995, in the non-sporting group. He then won Westminster’s toy group in 1998. Hosaka won his first Best In Show at Westminster in 2002 with Spice, a miniature poodle he'd bred, trained, and handled himself. This was the fulfilment of his long-held dream.

As a handler for over 40 years, Hosaka saw poodles as "an art form" and specialised in handling all poodle size varieties. He had a reputation for only handling good dogs. Hosaka was the handler for the toy poodle with the most wins in the breed's history (as of 2024), taking 108 Best in Show wins with the dog. He retired in 2024, after winning his second Westminster Best in Show with miniature poodle Sage, the great-granddaughter of the dog that first won him Best in Show at Westminster. Hosaka called it his "perfect end".

== Personal life ==
Hosaka had a son, Hiro, from a first marriage that ended in divorce. His second marriage was to Roxanne Wolf; they were married for over 30 years until his death. He died after a fall resulting in a traumatic brain injury on 23 June 2024

== Legacy ==
Hosaka has been called "to the poodle world what Michael Jordan is to basketball. Smooth, clever, elegant and nearly unbeatable.". He was known for being able to "achieve a rapport with his dogs", and for being "quiet, modest and unfailingly kind and generous".
