= Francine Leca =

French cardiac surgeon (1938–2024)

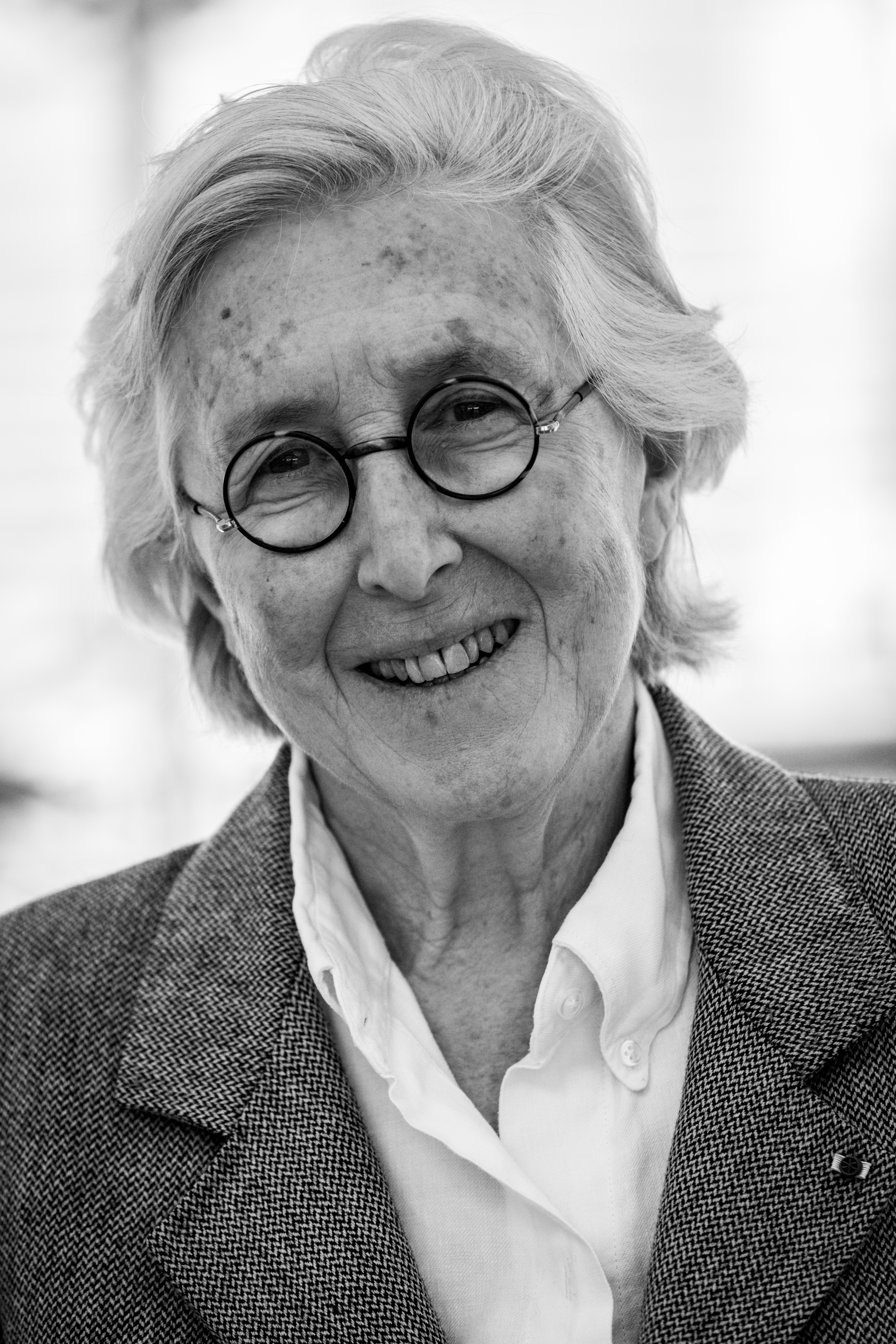
- Leca in 2015
- Born: Françoise Anne-Marie Rolande Leca; 20 May 1938; Neuilly-sur-Seine, France
- Died: 15 June 2024 (aged 86); Saint-Nom-la-Bretèche, Yvelines, France
- Education: Paris Descartes University
- Title: Professor of Medicine specialising in cardiac surgery

Francine Leca (20 May 1938 – 15 June 2024) was a French cardiac surgeon and professor of medicine specialising in heart surgery, a pioneer of the discipline in pediatrics.

== Biography ==
Francine Leca gravitated toward medicine at a very young age. During an internship in cardiac surgery under professor Jean Mathey at Laennec Hospital, she assisted her first open heart surgery. As an intern at hôpitaux de Paris, she discovered pediatric cardiac surgery under Professor George Lemoine. She went on to specialize in congenital heart defects.

Leca was the first woman to become a cardiac surgeon in France, and was the chief of services of cardiac surgery, first at Laennec Hospital and then Hôpital Necker in Paris until 2003.

In 1996 Leca along with Patrice Roynette founded the organization Mécénat Chirurgie cardiaque - Enfant du Monde (Mécénat Cardiac Surgery - Child of the World) which raises funds to treat children with serious heart conditions who could not otherwise receive treatment in their home countries.

Leca died on 15 June 2024 in Saint-Nom-la-Bretèche at the age of 86.

== Distinctions ==
- Grand Officer of the Legion of Honour.
- Grand Officer of the Ordre national du Mérite.

== Honors ==
- The Marcel Rudloff Prize of Tolerance 2015.
- Gold Women Trophy of 1998

== Bibliography ==
- Elizabeth Drévillon, Professeur Leca : Chirurgien du cœur, Éditions Anne Carrière, 2003. ISBN 978-2843372162
- Elide Montesi, « Francine Leca », in Les filles d'Hippocrate, Les Éditions Acrodacrolivres, 2014, p. 125–130 ISBN 9782930756233
