= Francesco Bruni (politician) =

Italian politician (1929–2024)

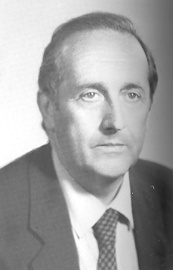
Image of Francesco Bruni

Francesco Bruni (29 January 1929 – 4 June 2024) was an Italian politician who served as a Deputy. Bruni died on 4 June 2024, at the age of 95.
