= Daniel Etounga-Manguelle =

Cameroonian economist and writer (1943–2024)

- Born: 20 January 1943; Ekoadjom, Makak, French Cameroon
- Died: 5 June 2024 (aged 81); Abidjan, Ivory Coast
- Education: École pratique des hautes études École nationale de l'aviation civile
- Occupations: Economist; Writer

Daniel Etounga-Manguelle (20 January 1943 – 5 June 2024) was a Cameroonian economist and writer. His work L’Afrique a-t-elle besoin d'un programme d’ajustement culture ? led to his rise to fame through his African economic doctrine.

== Biography ==
Born in Makak on 20 January 1943, Etounga-Manguelle studied in Yaoundé and Douala before pursuing postgraduate studies in France. He earned his engineering degree from the École nationale de l'aviation civil and a doctorate in economic planning from the École pratique des hautes études. After his studies, he worked as a consultant for an American firm and subsequently founded the Société africaine d'étude, d'exploitation et de gestion in Cameroon in 1989. He assisted numerous businesses in economic development, management, and financial strategy.

Etounga-Manguelle began his literary career in 1985 with the book Cent ans d’aliénation. He discussed the problems of underdeveloped, which he largely pinned on the Berlin Conference and the dismissal of the local knowledge of African subsistence farmers. His flagship work was published in 1991 and titled L’Afrique a-t-elle besoin d’un programme d’ajustement culturel? and proposed early questions on the sustainable development of Africa. The book was published by Editions Nouvelles du Sud and denounced the cultural defects hampering development efforts in African countries. It encouraged African states to look within at their lack of economic success through the behavior of citizens and their leaders. His 1997 book Pour reconstruire et moderniser le Cameroun, on va faire comment? examined the case for African development from the perspective of Cameroon. In 2004, he published Cameroun : une exception africaine ?, which made a case for land development in his home nation. He emphasized his advocacy for individual responsibility in Vers une société responsable : le cas de l'Afrique (2009). He further denounced the crisis of civilization in Africa.

Etounga-Manguelle died in Abidjan on 5 June 2024, at the age of 81.

== Publications ==
=== Essays ===
- Cent ans d’aliénation (1985)
- L'Afrique a-t-elle besoin d'un programme d'ajustement culturel ? (1990)
- Pour reconstruire et moderniser le Cameroun, on va faire comment ? (1997)
- Cameroun : une exception africaine ? (2004)
- Vers une société responsable : le cas de l'Afrique (2009)
- Éloge de la dissidence : propos sur la métaphysique du progrès (2013)
- Peut-on guérir d'une crise de civilisation ? : propos sur la pathologie du sous-développement (2015)
- D'où vient l'argent des Blancs ? (2017)
- Discours sur le bonheur : propos sur l'insatiable quête de bien-être des humains (2019)
- La politique est-elle une science ? (2020)

=== Novels ===
- La colline du fromager (1979)
- Maigida, ou le chasseur d'illusions (1999)
- Comme c'est beau la nuit une mer déchainée (2013)
- Là où le temps est resté : chroniques (2016)
