= Phuntsok Wangchuk =

Tibetan independence activist and political prisoner (1973–2024)

- Born: 1973; Nedong, Shannan, Tibet, China
- Died: 20 June 2024 (aged 50–51); New York City, U.S.
- Education: Tibet University
- Occupation: Activist

Phuntsok Wangchuk (Standard Tibetan: ཕུན་ཚོགས་དབང་ཕྱུག; 1973 – 20 June 2024) was a Tibetan independence activist and political prisoner.

== Biography ==
Born in Nedong in 1973, Wangchuk studied at Tibet University in Lhasa. During his schooling, he was taught the version of Tibetan history assigned by the Chinese Communist Party, but met a Tibetan professor who taught him the true history at age 16, which led him to engage in Tibetan independence activism. On 15 June 1994, he was arrested by seven Chinese police officers at 3:00 in the morning alongside one other student and two professors accused of putting up pro-independence posters in his village. He was sentenced to five years in prison for campaigning for freedom and human rights in Tibet. He was incarcerated at Drapchi Prison in Lhasa. During his incarceration in 1998, he organized a demonstration at the prison.

Upon his release, Wangchuk went into exile in India in 2000. From 2004 to 2010, he was secretary of the Political Prisoners Movement of Tibet.

Phunstok Wangchuk died in New York City on 20 June 2024.
