= Mario Alberto Becerra Pocoroba =

Mexican lawyer and politician (1955–2024)

- Born: 10 August 1955; Mexico City, Mexico
- Died: 17 June 2024 (aged 68)
- Education: Escuela Libre de Derecho
- Occupations: Lawyer and politician
- Political party: PAN

Mario Alberto Becerra Pocoroba (10 August 1955 – 17 June 2024) was a Mexican lawyer and politician from the National Action Party. From 2009 to 2012 he served as Deputy of the LXI Legislature of the Mexican Congress representing Guerrero. Becerra Pocoroba died on 17 June 2024, at the age of 68.
