= Jean-Pierre Descombes =

French television presenter (1947–2024)

Jean-Pierre Descombes (20 December 1947 – 30 June 2024) was a French television host.

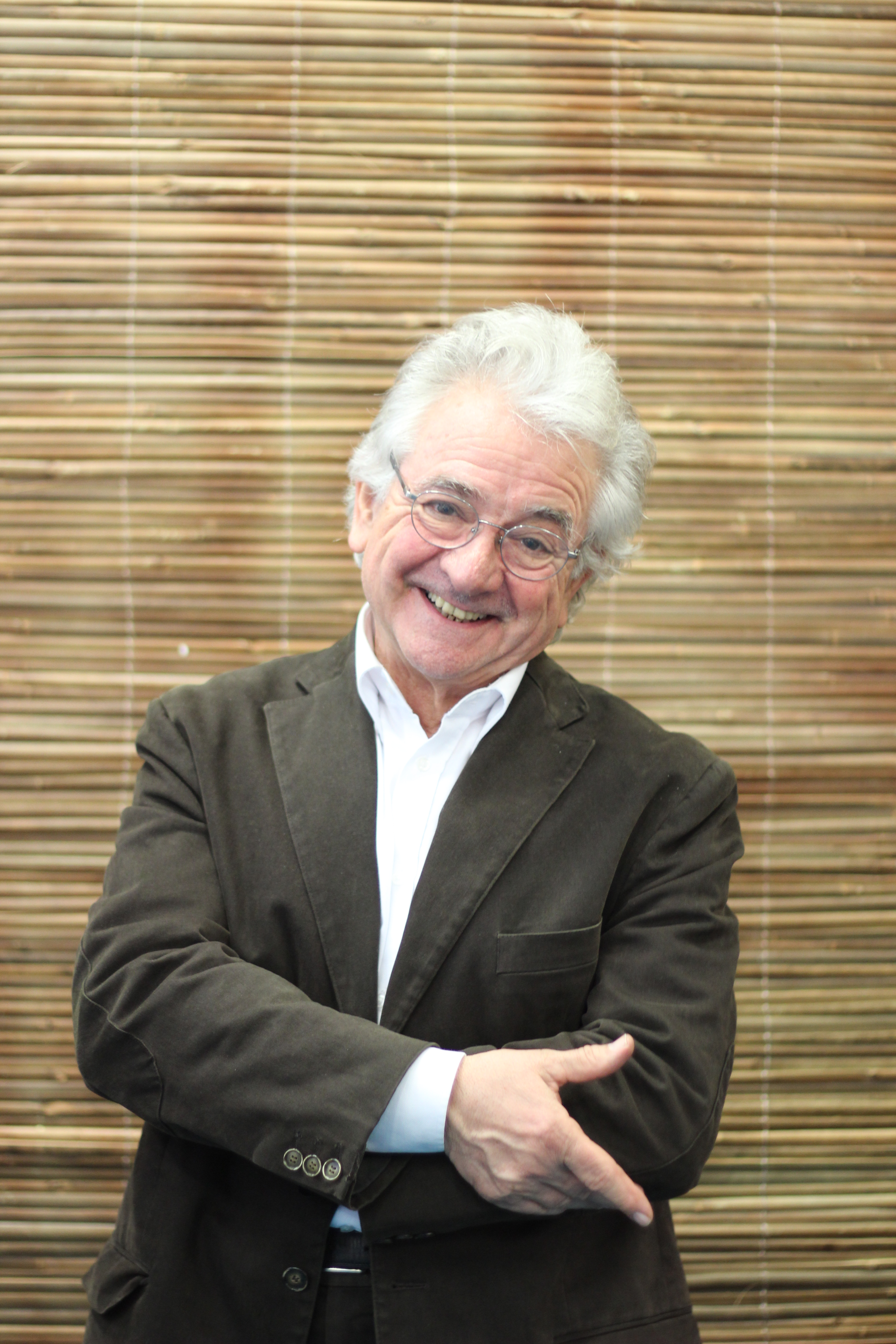
Descombes in 2018

== Life and career ==
Descombes was born in Romans-sur-Isère in the Drôme department on 20 December 1947. He is best known for having presented the shows Les Jeux de 20 heures and Les Petits Papiers de Noël on FR3 in the 1970s and 1980s. He was the voice-over for the games Le Juste Prix and Une famille en or on TF1 in the 1990s.

Descombes died from complications of Parkinson's disease on 30 June 2024, at the age of 76.
