= Hubert Lauper =

Swiss politician (1944–2024)

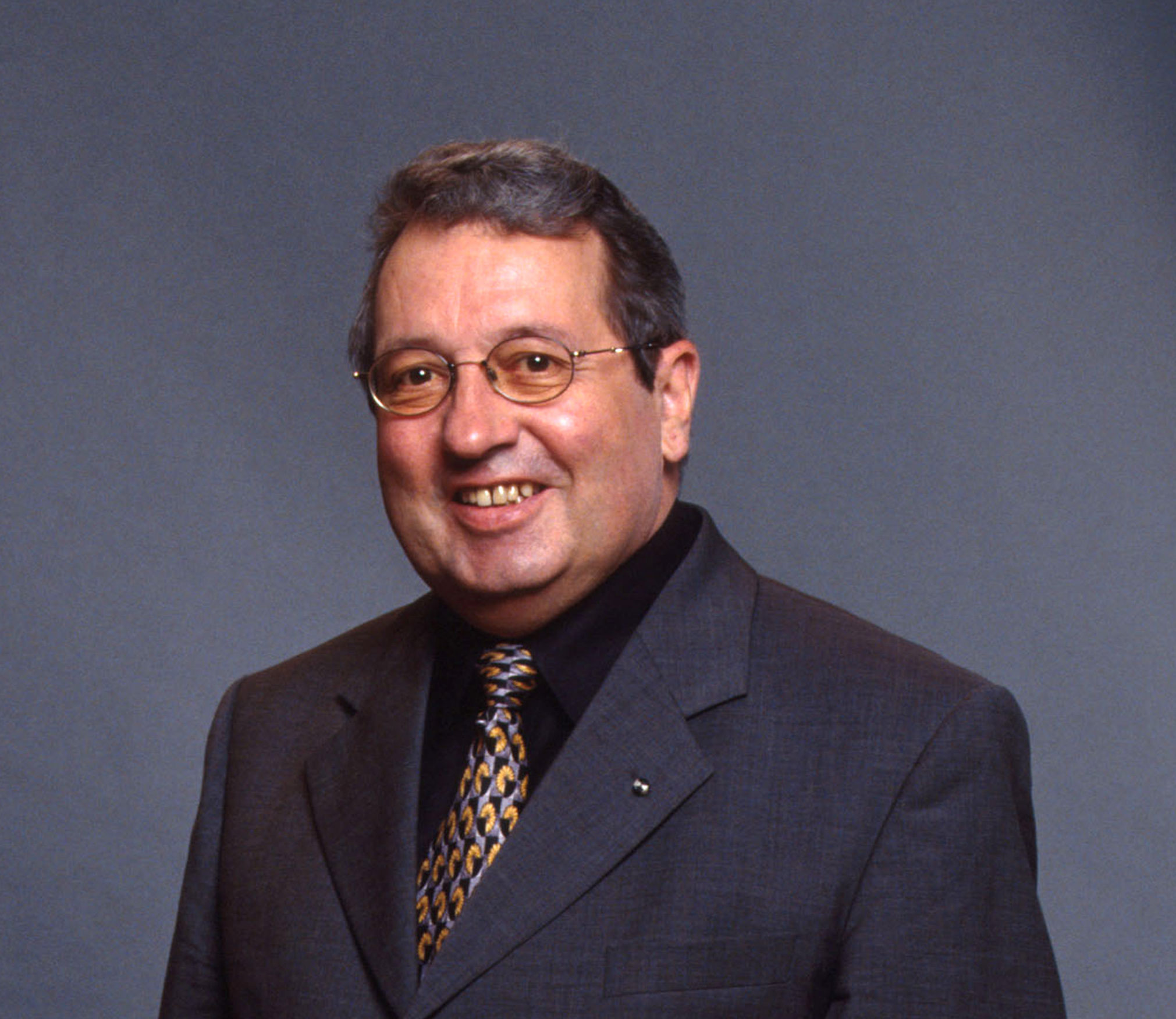

Member of the Swiss National Council
- In office 4 December 1995 – 30 November 2003

Prefect of Sarine District
- In office 1976–1996
- Preceded by: Laurent Butty
- Succeeded by: Nicolas Deiss

Personal details
- Born: 28 February 1944 Belfaux, Switzerland
- Died: 17 June 2024 (aged 80)
- Party: PDC
- Education: University of Fribourg
- Occupation: Lawyer

Hubert Lauper (28 February 1944 – 17 June 2024) was a Swiss politician of the Christian Democratic Party (PDC).

== Biography ==
Born in Belfaux on 28 February 1944, Lauper's family was originally from Giffers. He earned a degree in law and practice as a lawyer. As a member of the PDC, he served on the communal council of Belfaux from 1966 to 1976, where he served as trustee in 1970. On 14 November 1976, he was elected Prefect of Sarine District, succeeding Laurent Butty. Supported by the PDC and the remnants of the Party of Farmers, Traders and Independents, he received 59% of the vote against his opponent, Socialist Party member Félicien Morel's 41%. He was re-elected in 1981 and 1986 without opposition. In 1991, he was re-elected again with 80% of the vote against the Green Party's Gérard Bourgarel. He did not seek re-election in 1996 and was succeeded by Nicolas Deiss.

In 1986, Lauper ran in the Council of State of Fribourg election, but withdrew after the first round following a poor result. This was due to the fact that he was simultaneously running in the prefectural election, for which the results were incompatible. In 1995, he was elected to the National Council. His campaign was highly publicized due to the creation of its own website during a time in which only approximately one thousand internet users lived in the Canton of Fribourg. He did not run for re-election in 2003.

Lauper died on 17 June 2024, at the age of 80.
