= 2024 in Germany =

- Decades: 2000s; 2010s; 2020s; 2030s
- See also: Other events of 2024; History of Germany • Timeline • Years

The following is a list of events from the year 2024 in Germany.

== Incumbents ==
- President – Frank-Walter Steinmeier
- President of the Bundestag – Bärbel Bas
- Chancellor – Olaf Scholz
- President of the German Bundesrat: (Note: The President of the Bundesrat, the speaker of the Bundesrat, a federal legislative chamber, in which the governments of the sixteen German states are represented. The president of the Bundesrat is ex officio also deputy to the President of Germany (Basic Law, Article 57), thus becomes first in the order, while acting on behalf of the President or while acting as head of state during a vacancy of the presidency.)
  - Manuela Schwesig (until 1 November 2024)
  - Anke Rehlinger (from 1 November 2024)
- President of the Federal Constitutional Court – Stephan Harbarth

== Events ==
=== January ===
- 5 January – Four people are killed and others are injured during a fire at a hospital in Uelzen.
- 8 January – Farmers block highway access roads in parts of Germany, launching a week of protests against a government plan to remove tax breaks on diesel used in agriculture.
- 10 January – Protests are held across Germany calling for a ban of Alternative for Germany in the wake of the 2023 Potsdam far-right meeting.
- 10–28 January – 2024 European Men's Handball Championship
- 23 January
  - The Federal Constitutional Court rules that the far-right minor party Die Heimat (The Homeland), formerly the National Democratic Party of Germany (NPD), should not get state funding.
  - Germany announces that it will donate six SH-3 Sea King helicopters to the Ukrainian Air Force to help it patrol the Black Sea.

=== February ===
- 2 February – In the Bundestag, left wing MPs reorganise into the new BSW group and The Left group.
- 8–11 February – 2024 Women's EuroHockey Indoor Championship in Berlin
- 14 February – Following protests and blockades by farmers, Alliance 90/The Greens cancels their annual event for Ash Wednesday due to security concerns.
- 23 February – The Bundestag legalises recreational usage of cannabis for adults, making Germany the third European country to do so after Luxembourg and Malta.

=== March ===
- 1 March – A soldier kills four people during a spree shooting in Scheeßel and Bothel in Lower Saxony before being detained.
- 4 March
  - Four people are killed and 21 others are injured in a fire at a nursing home in Bedburg-Hau, North Rhine-Westphalia.
  - German police surround Luisenhospital in Aachen after an armed woman barricades herself inside a room. The woman is later arrested.
- 19 March – Austrian far-right political activist, and leader of the Identitarian Movement of Austria Martin Sellner is banned from entering Germany for three years.
- 22 March – The Bundesrat approves a partial legalization of cannabis in Germany, set to come into effect on 1 April.
- 27 March – At least five people are killed and 20 more injured after a double-decker FlixBus overturns and falls near Leipzig.

=== April ===
- 14 April – In association football, Bayer 04 Leverkusen win their first Bundesliga title.
- 18 April – Two German-Russian nationals are arrested for an alleged military sabotage plot on behalf of Russia in an effort to undermine military support for Ukraine.
- 27 April – More than 1,000 Islamists protest in Hamburg for a Caliphate and Sharia law in Germany.

=== May ===
- 4 May – Member of the European Parliament Matthias Ecke is "seriously injured" following what is suspected to be a politically motivated attack in Dresden.
- 7 May – Deputy mayor of Berlin Franziska Giffey is injured after being bludgeoned with a bag containing a heavy item.
- 10 May – 800 protesters storm the Tesla plant in Grünheide in protest of the company's expansion's impact on the environment.
- 13 May – A high court in Münster upholds the designation and surveillance of the Alternative for Germany (AfD) as a "suspected" far-right extremist organization.
- 14 May – Björn Höcke, the leader of the AfD in Thuringia is fined by a court for using the Nazi slogan "Everything for Germany".
- 16 May – Three people are killed in a fire at a residential building in Düsseldorf.
- 21 May
  - The trial for members of the Reichsbürger movement involved in the 2022 German coup d'état plot begins in Frankfurt.
  - Jenny Erpenbeck wins the International Booker Prize for her novel Kairos, translated from the German by Michael Hofmann.
- 22 May – The AfD bans Maximilian Krah, its leading candidate in the European parliament elections, from further activities due to his comments defending members of the Schutzstaffel.
- 23 May – The AfD is expelled from the Identity and Democracy grouping in the European Parliament in response to Maximilian Krah's comments on the Schutzstaffel.
- 24 May – Two people are arrested on suspicion of plotting a knife attack on a synagogue in Heidelberg.
- 27 May – A court in Düsseldorf convicts and sentences a Bundeswehr captain to 3.5 years imprisonment for spying for Russia.
- 31 May – 2024 Mannheim stabbing: A police officer is killed while five people, including far-right activist Michael Stürzenberger, are injured in a knife attack in Mannheim. The suspected attacker, identified as a 25-year-old Afghan refugee named Sulaiman A., is shot and injured by police.

=== June ===
- 1–5 June – At least six people are killed during floods in Bavaria and Baden-Württemberg.
- 1 June – A long-distance train carrying 185 passengers derails after the ground under a section of railway gives way near Schwäbisch Gmünd, Baden-Württemberg. No injuries are reported.
- 4 June – An AfD candidate for state elections in Baden-Württemberg is injured in a stabbing attack in Mannheim.
- 6 June – A group of protesters on their way to an antifascist demonstration are attacked by a group of 15-20 alleged neo-Nazis at Berlin Ostkreuz. Two people are hospitalised due to head injuries.
- 9 June
  - 2024 European Parliament election in Germany: Conservative parties retain their plurality in the German contingent of the European Parliament. The AfD prevails in all five former East German states.
  - 2024 Hamburg borough elections
- 14 June
  - One person is killed and three others are injured in a stabbing attack in Wolmirstedt, Saxony-Anhalt. The attacker is shot dead by police.
  - Germany vetoes a European Union sanction package that would prevent EU members from re-exporting Russian liquefied natural gas from EU ports and prevent EU companies from selling sanctioned products to Russia.
- 16 June – One person is injured after being shot by police on suspicion of threatening them with a pickaxe and an incendiary device in Hamburg.
- 17 June – Authorities announce the largest seizure of cocaine in Germany following raids in Düsseldorf and Hamburg in 2023 that yield 60.5 metric tons of the substance valued at 2.6 billion euros ($2.78 billion).
- 19 June – An Iraqi national is arrested in Esslingen am Neckar on suspicion of plotting to carry out attacks for Islamic State.
- 23 June – A police officer is killed in a collision involving a car and a motorcycle escort of visiting Hungarian Prime Minister Viktor Orban in Stuttgart.
- 24 June – The AFD announces a local coalition with neofascist party Die Heimat in Lauchhammer, Brandenburg.
- 26 June – Government ministers agree on legislation to expedite deportation for individuals who post or "like" social media content that celebrates or promotes terrorist acts.
- 28 June – The Higher Regional Court of Cologne convicts a 15-year old boy of plotting to attack a Christmas market in Leverkusen with Islamic extremist motivations and sentences him to four years' imprisonment.
- 28 June – 23 year old antifascist activist Maja T. is ordered extradited to Hungary to face trial on charges of membership in a criminal organisation that wanted to attack right-wing extremist by a court in Berlin despite concerns over her safety as a genderqueer person in Hungary and despite an ongoing expedited procedure by the Federal Constitutional Court.
- 29 June – Over 100,000 protesters and 1,000 police officers clash at an AfD party conference in Essen.

=== July ===
- 1 July – Björn Höcke, the leader of the AfD in Thuringia is fined by a court in Halle for again using the Nazi slogan "Everything for Germany". This is the second time fine on Höcke for the slogan.
- 3 July – Investigators in Germany and Sweden arrest eight suspects allied with Syrian President Bashar al-Assad's government over alleged participation in crimes against humanity in Syria.
- 4 July – Germany summons Turkey's ambassador in Berlin in a tit-for-tat move over footballer Merih Demiral's wolf salute gesture while celebrating a goal at the UEFA Euro 2024.
- 5 July – The Cabinet of Germany agrees on a 2025 budget plan, averting collapse of the current cabinet following party disagreements and pressure from The Greens to forego its "debt brake" to increase emergency borrowing for military aid to Ukraine.
- 11 July – CNN reports that American and German intelligence foiled a Russian plot to assassinate Armin Papperger, the CEO of defence company Rheinmetall.
- 14 July
  - Two people are killed and two others injured during a mass shooting believed to be connected to a domestic dispute at a home in Lautlingen, Baden-Württemberg. The gunman commits suicide.
  - The UEFA Euro 2024 final takes place in Berlin, with Spain winning 2-1 over England.
  - A Lebanese national is arrested in Salzgitter on suspicion of procuring drone components for Hezbollah.
- 15 July – NATO establishes a new command centre in Wiesbaden to plan and coordinate support for the Ukrainian military as part of the NATO Security Assistance and Training for Ukraine.
- 16 July – Interior minister Nancy Faeser orders the banning of the magazine Compact, its publisher Compact-Magazin GmbH, and the film production company Conspect Film for promoting extremist right-wing views and inciting violence against Jews and migrants.
- 17 July
  - A court in Stuttgart convicts a dual Russian-German national of violating export laws by delivering electronic components to Russian firms involved in the production of military equipment from 2020 to 2023 and sentences him to six years and nine months' imprisonment.
  - Germany issues plans to halve its military aid to Ukraine in 2025.
- 19 July – The Minsk Regional Court in Belarus, in a secretive trial, sentences German national Rico Krieger to death over alleged crimes including terrorism and mercenary activity. He is pardoned on 30 July by President Alexander Lukashenko.
- 20 July – Demonstrators carrying Afghan flags storm the Pakistani consulate in Frankfurt.
- 21 July – A climber is killed after being struck by lightning on the Zugspitze.
- 22 July – The Constitutional Court of North Rhine-Westphalia rules that there is no longer a general danger to civilians fleeing from the Syrian Civil War in its rejection of an asylum application.
- 24 July – The Federal Interior Ministry orders the banning of the Islamic Centre Hamburg for being an "Islamist extremist organisation" with links to Hezbollah and Iran.

=== August ===
- 2 August – Twenty-two people are injured in an explosion believed to have been caused by a compressed air canister at the Nürburgring race track.
- 6 August
  - At least two people are killed after a hotel collapses in Kröv.
  - A court in Berlin convicts a woman and fines her for "condoning a crime" by leading a chant using the phrase "From the river to the sea, Palestine will be free" during a protest in October 2023.
- 7 August – A doctor in Berlin is arrested on suspicion of killing four of his elderly patients and setting fire to their residences.
- 14 August
  - A court in Germany orders the arrest of a Ukrainian diving instructor on suspicion of involvement in the 2022 Nord Stream pipeline sabotage.
  - A suspected sabotage attack is reported at the Wahn barracks of the German Air Force adjacent to Cologne Bonn Airport.
- 15 August
  - Ukraine denies its involvement in explosions that damaged the Nord Stream 2 pipeline and accuses Russia of causing the explosions, following Germany issuing its first arrest warrant on the case towards a Ukrainian man.
  - The United States approves the sale of 600 MIM-104 Patriot air defense missile systems to Germany worth US$5 billion (€4.6 billion) to improve German national defense and the overall security of NATO.
  - New Zealand extradites German hacker and Megaupload founder Kim Dotcom to the United States to face charges for computer fraud, cyber espionage, and embezzlement.
- 17 August
  - Germany issues an indefinite ban on requesting or providing new military aid to Ukraine that has not already been approved in order to reduce federal budget spending. The moratorium results in a "tangible dispute" within the Scholz coalition government.
  - Four convicts escape in a prison break at a psychiatric hospital in Straubing, Bavaria.
- 18 August – Twenty-three people are injured in a fire on a Ferris wheel installed during the Highfield Festival in Leipzig.
- 20 August – Following the ordered closure of the Islamic Centre Hamburg in Hamburg, Iran orders the closure of two branches of a German language school in Tehran for "breaching Iranian law, committing various illegal actions and extensive financial violations." In response, Germany summons the Iranian ambassador.
- 23 August – 2024 Solingen stabbing: Three people are killed and eight others are wounded after a mass stabbing at a festival in Solingen marking the 650th anniversary of the city. A 26-year old man confesses to the killings after surrendering on 25 August.
- 26 August – Germany announces that it will donate 100,000 doses of mpox vaccines to the Democratic Republic of the Congo and other African nations, as well as provide funding to the GAVI Vaccine Alliance through the World Health Organization.
- 27 August – A 26-year old man armed with two knives is shot dead by police after threatening civilians in Moers.
- 29 August – The government of Hamburg expels the Iranian leader of the Islamic Centre Hamburg Mohammad Hadi Mofatteh, giving him an 11 September deadline to leave the country or face deportation.
- 30 August
  - Germany carries out its first deportation of Afghan nationals convicted of crimes since the Taliban takeover in 2021.
  - Six people are wounded in a stabbing attack on a bus in Siegen, North Rhine-Westphalia.

=== September ===
- 1 September – Two Eastern states vote in state elections.
  - 2024 Saxony state election: The CDU wins a plurality in elections for the Landtag of Saxony. The AfD finishes a close second.
  - 2024 Thuringian state election: The AfD wins a plurality (32%) in elections for the Landtag of Thuringia, marking the first time that a far-right party won a state election in Germany since World War II.
- 5 September – 2024 Munich shooting: An armed person is shot dead by police in Munich near the Munich Documentation Centre for the History of National Socialism and the Israeli consulate.
- 9 September – The German government announces border restrictions on all its national land borders, including those with other European Union members, for at least six months to combat irregular migration from asylum seekers.
- 12 September – A suspected Islamic extremist is arrested in Munich on suspicion of plotting attacks against German soldiers.
- 13 September – Germany and Kenya agree on a labour migration deal which will see 250,000 skilled and semi-skilled Kenyan workers go work in Germany amid a shortage of skilled labour in the German economy. The agreement will also simplify the return of illegal migrants to Kenya.
- 21 September – A previously unknown piece composed by Wolfgang Amadeus Mozart, Ganz kleine Nachtmusik, is discovered at a library in Leipzig. The seven miniature movements for a string trio were probably composed in the 1760s, when Mozart was in his early teens.
- 22 September – 2024 Brandenburg state election: The SPD remains the largest party in the Landtag of Brandenburg, while the AfD finishes a close second with 29.2%.
- 23 September – Police announce that they found 95 kg (209 lb) of cocaine worth €7 million ($7.8 million) hidden inside banana crates in supermarkets across North Rhine-Westphalia.
- 24 September– Jörg Dornau, a lawmaker for the AfD in Saxony, is revealed to be using Belarusian political prisoners as labour by independent Belarusian news outlet Reform.news.
- 25 September – The joint leaders of Alliance 90/The Greens, Omid Nouripour and Ricarda Lang, state that they will step down following significant election defeats.
- 28 September – Thirty people are injured in a series of arson and vehicle-ramming attacks in Essen. The suspect, a Syrian national, is arrested.

=== October ===
- 1 October
  - IBM's first quantum data centre in Europe is opened in Ehningen.
  - A Chinese national is arrested in Leipzig on suspicion of spying on Leipzig/Halle Airport for Chinese intelligence and passing information to an aide of AfD lawmaker Maximilian Krah.
- 11 October
  - The oil tanker Annika catches fire in the Baltic Sea while sailing in an area between Kühlungsborn and Warnemünde. All seven crew on board are rescued, while the ship is towed to Rostock.
  - U.S. Airman Grant Harrison was found not guilty in the 2023 killing of Michael Ovsjannikov in Wittlich.
- 14 October – A court in Berlin sentences a former Stasi officer identified as 80-year old Martin Manfred N to ten years' imprisonment for shooting Polish Cold War defector Czesław Kukuczka along the Berlin Wall in 1974.
- 19 October – A Libyan national is arrested in Bernau bei Berlin on suspicion of plotting a gun attack on the Israeli embassy on behalf of Islamic State.
- 22 October – The first case of clade 1b mpox in Germany is discovered in a patient who had travelled abroad.
- 27 October – Jamshid Sharmahd, a dissident carrying dual Iranian and German citizenship, is executed by Iran for allegedly leading a US-based pro-monarchist group and terrorism, prompting the German government to recall its ambassador to Tehran on 29 October and close all three consulates of Iran in Germany on 31 October.

=== November ===
- 1 November – The Self-Determination Act, allowing people aged 18 and older to change official records to alter their names and genders or have the gender marker removed altogether, comes into effect.
- 5 November – Eight people are arrested on suspicion of plotting an illegal seizure of power in Saxony as part of the far-right militant group Sächsische Separatisten (Saxonian Separatists).
- 7 November
  - Chancellor Scholz dismisses FDP leader Christian Lindner from his position as finance minister, leading to two other FDP ministers resigning and the collapse of the governing coalition.
  - An American resident of Frankfurt and former employee of the US Armed Forces in Germany is arrested on suspicion of spying for China.
- 18 November – A section of the C-Lion1 submarine communications cable running under the Baltic Sea between Finland and Germany is severed off the Swedish coast in what German authorities suspect as an act of sabotage.
- 26 November – A person is arrested in Koblenz on suspicion of plotting pipe bomb attacks on behalf of Islamic State.
- 29 November – Bijan Djir-Sarai resigns as general secretary of the FDP amid controversy over the party's departure from the governing coalition.

=== December ===
- 4 December – One person is killed in a crossbow attack inside a hospital in Bad Zwesten. The suspect is arrested.
- 8 December – Three people from Mannheim and Hesse are arrested on suspicion of plotting a terrorist attack on behalf of Islamic State.
- 9 December – The Federal Office for Migration and Refugees suspends the processing of asylum requests from 47,770 Syrian nationals in response to the fall of the Assad regime in Syria.
- 16 December – Chancellor Olaf Scholz loses a no-confidence vote in the Bundestag.
- 19 December – The Bundestag votes to require a two-thirds majority from its members to approve measures regarding the operations of the Federal Constitutional Court as part of efforts to safeguard the judiciary against possible authoritarian interventions.
- 20 December – 2024 Magdeburg car attack: A car drives into a crowd at a Christmas market in Magdeburg, killing six people and injuring at least 205. The suspected perpetrator, a 50-year-old doctor from Saudi Arabia, is arrested.
- 27 December – President Frank-Walter Steinmeier dissolves the 20th Bundestag.
- 28 December – Elon Musk published an opinion piece supporting the Alternative for Germany (AfD) in the German newspaper Welt am Sonntag.
- 31 December – Two people are injured in a knife attack in Charlottenburg, Berlin. A Syrian national carrying Swedish residency is arrested.

== Holidays ==
- 1 January – New Year's Day
- 6 January – Epiphany
- 8 March – International Women's Day
- 28 March – Maundy Thursday
- 29 March – Good Friday
- 31 March – Easter Sunday
- 1 April – Easter Monday
- 1 May – International Workers' Day
- 9 May – Ascension Day
- 19 May – Whit Sunday
- 20 May – Whit Monday
- 30 May – Corpus Christi
- 15 August – Assumption Day
- 20 September – Children's Day
- 3 October – German Unity Day
- 31 October – Reformation Day
- 1 November – All Saints' Day
- 20 November – Repentance Day
- 25 December – Christmas Day
- 26 December – Saint Stephen's Day

== Art and entertainment ==
- List of German films of 2024
- List of 2024 box office number-one films in Germany
- List of German submissions for the Academy Award for Best International Feature Film

== Deaths ==
=== January ===
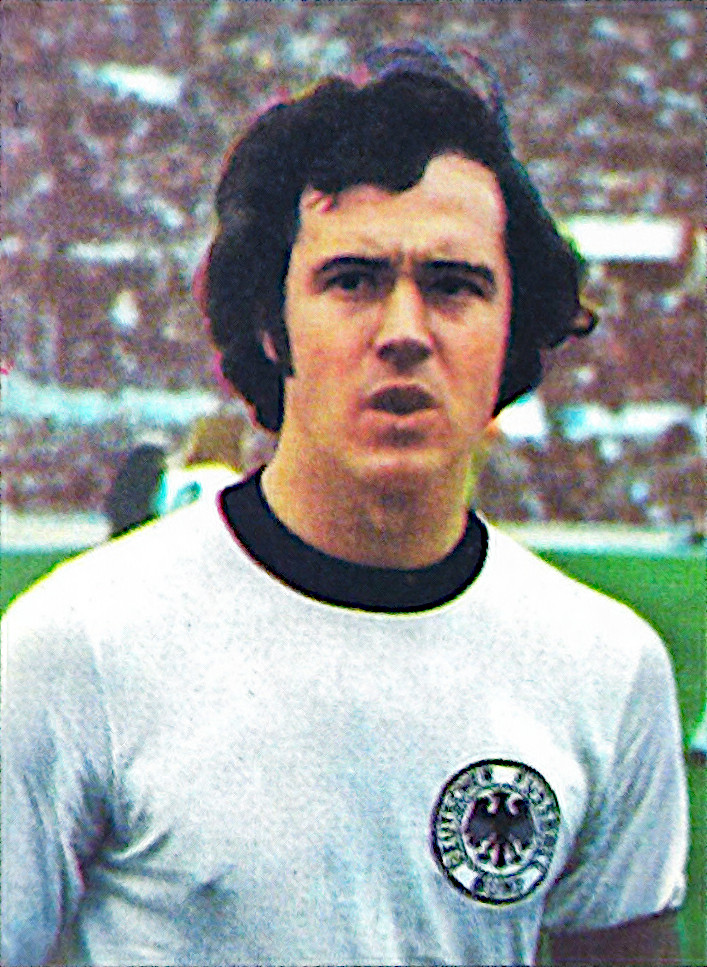
Franz Beckenbauer

- 1 January – Hartmut Ritzerfeld, 73, painter
- 2 January – Chris Karrer, 76, guitarist and composer
- 3 January – Günther Fielmann, 84, eyewear retailer, founder of Fielmann
- 4 January – Christian Oliver, 51, actor known for Cobra 11 television series
- 5 January
  - Herbert Linge, 95, racing and rally driver
  - Nicholas Rescher, 95, German-American philosopher, founder of American Philosophical Quarterly, History of Philosophy Quarterly and Public Affairs Quarterly
  - Robert Rosenthal, 90, German-born American psychologist
- 6 January – Erwin Schild, 103, German-born Canadian Conservative rabbi and author
- 7 January – Franz Beckenbauer, 78, footballer (Bayern Munich, national team)
- 11 January – Sigi Schwab, 83, guitarist
- 13 January – Sigi Rothemund, 79, film director
- 16 January – Kay Bernstein, 43, entrepreneur, president of Hertha BSC (2022–2024)
- 17 January – Ulrich Voß, 85, actor and writer
- 19 January – Klaus Wunder, 73, footballer (MSV Duisburg, Bayern Munich, 1972 Olympics)
- 22 January – Elke Erb, 85, author
- 23 January – Frank Farian, 82, singer and record producer (Boney M, Milli Vanilli)
- 26 January – Hartmut Bagger, 85, general
- 30 January
  - Achim Benning, 89, actor and theater director
  - Helmut Peuser, 83, German politician.

=== February ===
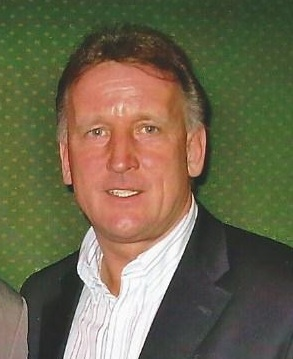
Andreas Brehme

- 2 February – Oskar Negt, 90, philosopher and social theorist
- 5 February
  - Helga Paris, 85, photographer
  - Peter Kulka, 86, architect
- 10 February – Johanna von Koczian, 90, actress
- 14 February – Wolfgang Weider, 91, Roman Catholic prelate
- 19 February
  - Jan Assmann, 85, Egyptologist
  - Naumann, 98, actor
  - Rabeya Müller, 67, Islamic scholar
- 20 February – Andreas Brehme, 63, footballer and coach
- 24 February – Bernard Broermann, 80, businessman and entrepreneur
- 25 February
  - Horst Schmidbauer, 79, politician
  - Fabian Schulze, 39, pole vaulter
- 26 February
  - Alois Glück, 84, politician
  - Pollesch, 62, author and dramatist
  - Ruth Wolf-Rehfeldt, 92, artist

=== March ===
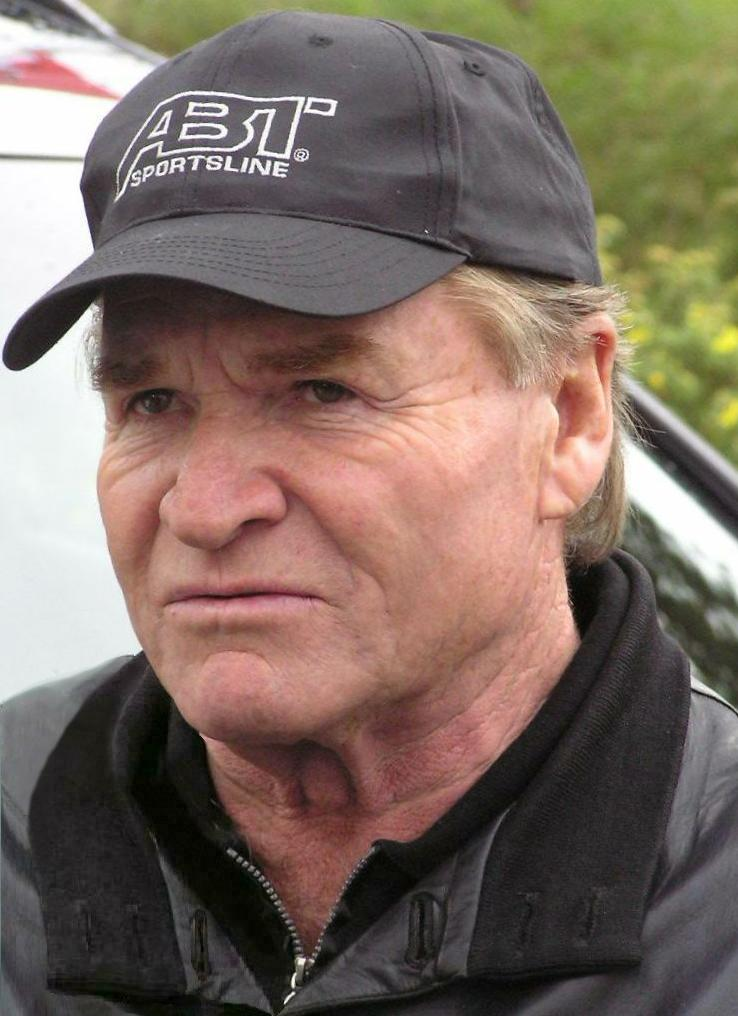
Fritz Wepper

- 1 March – Klaus-Peter Jörns, 84, Christian theologian and author
- 6 March – Dietrich Rusche, 87, politician (CDU)
- 13 March
  - Aribert Reimann, 88, composer
  - Notker Hammerstein, 93, historian
  - Matthias Schießleder, 87, judoka
- 15 March
  - Hans Blum, 95, composer
  - Paul Josef Cordes, 89, Roman Catholic cardinal
- 18 March – Peter Kunter, 72, footballer
- 25 March – Fritz Wepper, 82, actor

=== April ===
- 2 April
  - Gerhard Lohfink, 89, Roman Catholic priest and theologian
  - Notker Wolf, 83, Benedictine monk, priest, musician and author
- 3 April – Vera Tschechowa, 79, actress, screenwriter, director and film producer
- 5 April – Peter Sodann, 87, actor
- 7 April – Michael Boder, 65, conductor
- 9 April
  - Eckart Dux, 97, actor and voice artist
  - Dieter Rexroth, 83, musicologist, dramaturge and cultural manager
- 11 April
  - Peter Fulde, 88, physicist
  - Peter Förtig, 90, composer and music theorist
- 13 April – Klaus Wolfgang Niemöller, 94, musicologist
- 14 April – Steffen Heitmann, 79, politician
- 15 April – Bernd Hölzenbein, 78, footballer
- 16 April – Wichart von Roëll, 86, actor
- 19 April – Siegfried Kirschen, 80, football referee
- 22 April – Michael Verhoeven, 85, film director
- 26 April – Volker Mosblech, 69, politician
- 28 April – Walter Kolbow, 80, politician

=== May ===
- 10 May – Gerhard Müller, 95, Lutheran theologian and bishop
- 20 May – Karl-Heinz Schnellinger, 95, football player
- 22 May – Rolf-Ernst Breuer, 86, banker and businessman

=== June ===
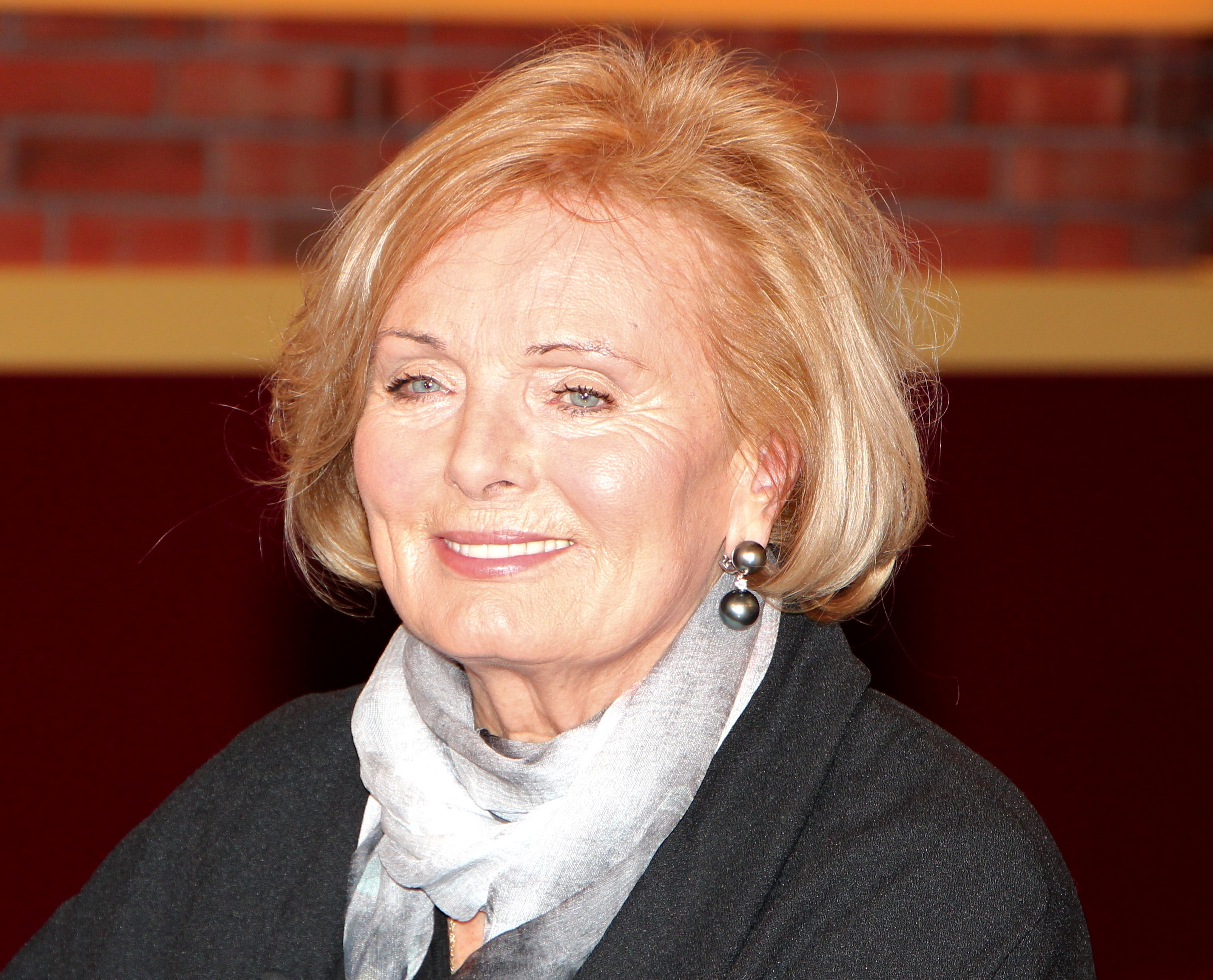
Ruth Maria Kubitschek

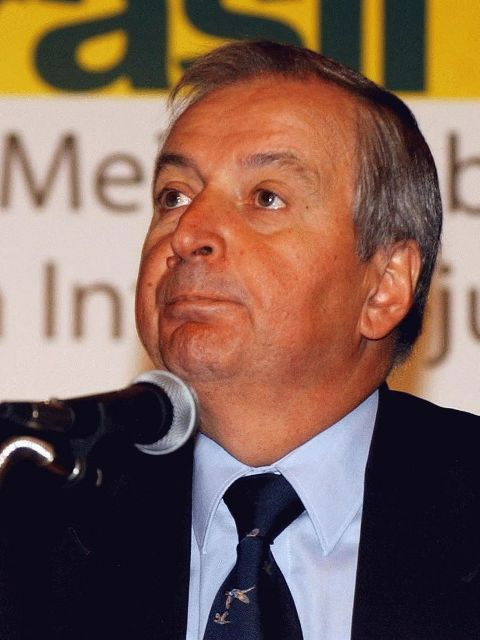
Klaus Töpfer

- 1 June – Ruth Maria Kubitschek, 92, actress
- 5 June – Reiner Uthoff, 86, writer and stage director
- 7 June – Gerhard Rödding, 91, politician
- 8 June – Klaus Toepfer, 85, politician
- 11 June
  - Walter Schmitt Glaeser, 90, politician
  - Gerhard Merz, 71, politician
- 15 June
  - Manfred Ach, 83, politician
  - Barbara Schäfer, 79, politician
- 21 June
  - Gerhard Hund, 92, computer scientist and mathematician
  - Heinz Lanfermann, 74, politician
- 22 June – Beatrix Nobis, 74, art historian
- 23 June – Michael Krause, 77, field hockey player
- 26 June
  - Willi Waike, 86, politician
  - Karl-Hans Laermann, 94, politician

=== July ===
- 1 July – Renate Hoy, 93, actress and beauty pageant holder
- 4 July – Reiner Pommerin, 81, historian
- 10 July – Thomas Hoepker, 88, photographer
- 11 July
  - Heinrich Fürst zu Fürstenberg, 73, landowner and businessman
  - Willi Koslowski, 87, footballer
  - Tomas Seyler, 49, darts player
- 12 July – Jens Odewald, 83, business executive
- 13 July
  - Ruth Hesse, 87, opera singer
  - Erwin Junker, 94, manufacturer
- 27 July – Wolfgang Rihm, 72, composer
- 30 July – Hans Lenk, 89, rower, Olympic champion

=== August ===
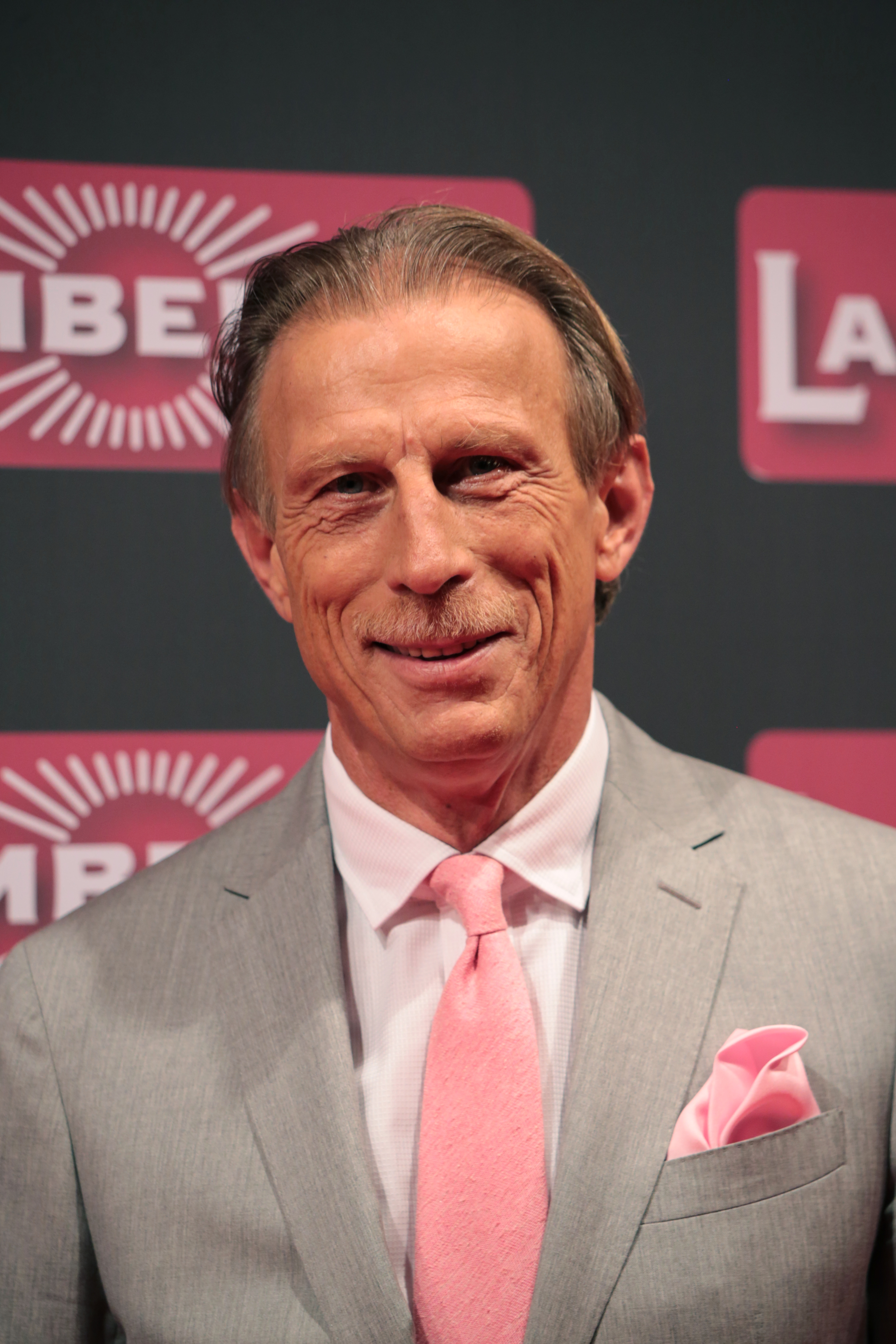
Christoph Daum

- 1 August – Peter Kraus, 83, field hockey player
- 6 August – Christof Nel, 80, theatre manager
- 9 August
  - Kasper König, 80, museum curator and director
  - Barbara Konneker, 89, scholar of German studies
- 11 August – Richard Rogler, 79, cabarettist and comedian
- 12 August – Wilfried Lemke, 77, football manager
- 13 August –
  - Franz Quarthal, 80, historian
  - Christian von Ferber, 98, sociologist and author
  - Reinhard Meyer zu Bentrup, 85, farmer and politician (CDU)
- 14 August – Hermann Haken, 97, physician
- 15 August – Joachim Seelig, 82, chemist
- 17 August
  - Peter Bernholz, 95, economist
  - Hans J. Schäfer, 87, chemist
- 18 August
  - Meinolf Dierkes, 83, sociologist and author
  - Ulrike Hoffmann-Richter, 66, psychiatrist and author
  - Ronny Borchers, 67, football player
- 20 August– Werner Bokelberg, 87, photographer and film actor
- 21 August
  - Karl Schlecht, 91, entrepreneur
  - Hans Weiner, 73, football player
- 24 August
  - Christoph Daum, 70, football manager
  - Siegfried Lorenz, 78, baritone and musician
  - Dieter Schinzel, 81, politician (SPD)
- 25 August – Claus Jönsson, 94, physicist
- 27 August – Charlotte Kretschmann, 114, supercentenarian

=== September ===
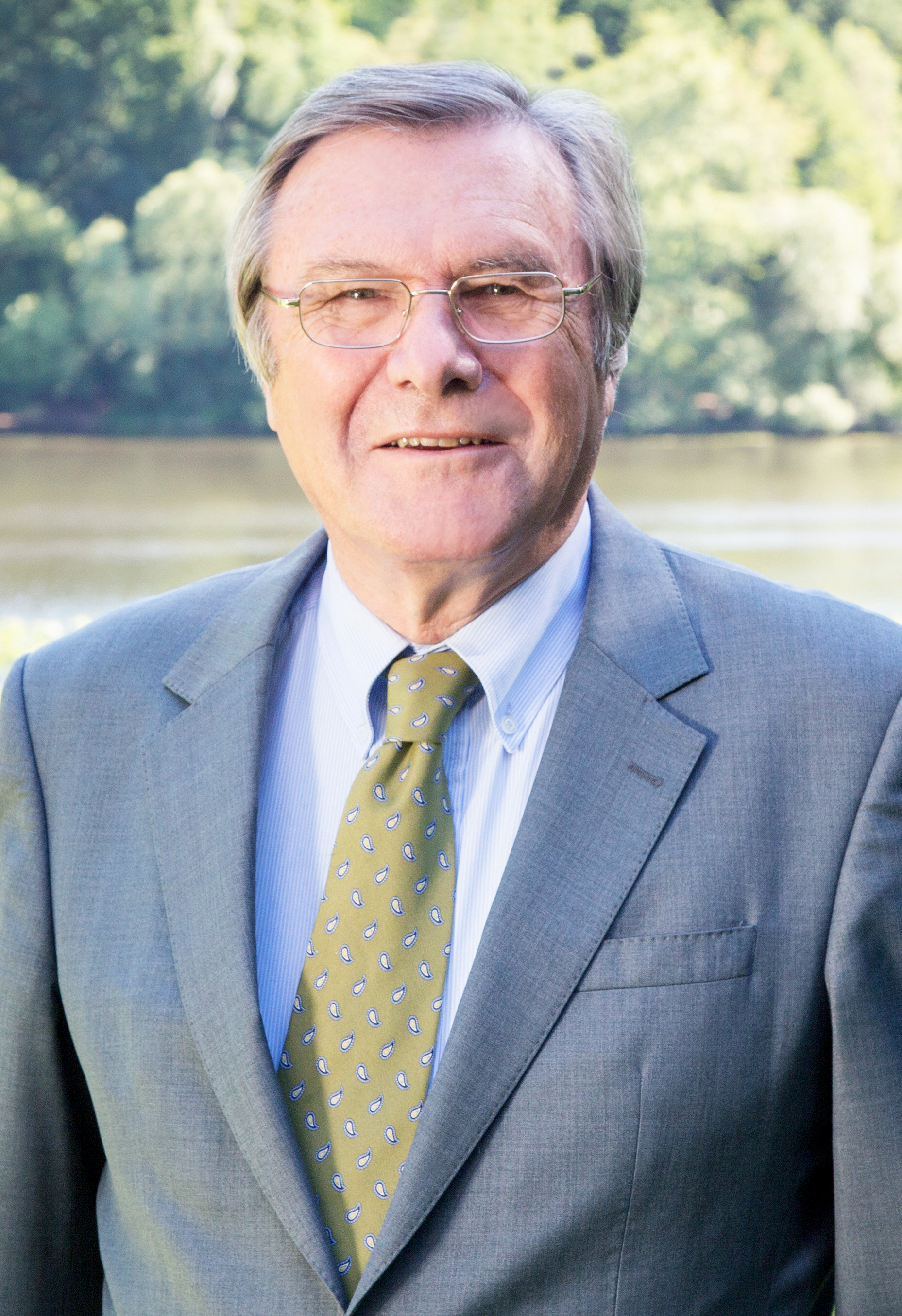
Wolfgang Gerhardt

- 5 September – Werner Nachtigall, 90, biologist and zoologist
- 9 September – Friedrich Schorlemmer, 80, Protestant theologian
- 13 September – Wolfgang Gerhardt, 80, politician

=== October ===
- 4 October – Willi Giesemann, 86, footballer
- 7 October – Georg Krücken, 62, sociologist
- 9 October – Dieter Burdenski, 74, footballer
- 12 October – Rainer Prachtl, 74, politician
- 13 October – Brunhilde Hanke, 94, politician
- 16 October – Christian Martin Schmidt, 81, musicologist and music theorist
- 20 October – Willi A. Kalender, 75, physicist
- 22 October – Annelie Ehrhardt, 74, hurdler
- 27 October – Edzard Reuter, 96, manager and businessman
- 28 October – Franz Kamphaus, 92, Roman-Catholic prelate and bishop

=== November ===
- 12 November – Michael Hübner, 65, track cyclist
- 22 November – Jürgen Thormann, 96, actor
- 26 November – Karin Baal, 84, actress

=== December ===
- 1 December
  - Helmut Münch, 85, politician
  - Ilke Wyludda, 55, discus thrower
- 5 December – Christel Bodenstein, 96, actress
- 9 December
  - Friedhelm Farthmann, 94, politician
  - Gerd Heidemann, 93, journalist
- 12 December – Wolfgang Becker, 70, film director
- 18 December
  - Klaus Wolfermann, 78, javelin thrower
  - Sigrid Kehl, 95, soprano
- 21 December – Hannelore Hoger, 82, actress
- 22 December – Herbert Rusche, 72, politician
- 23 December – Helmut Schlesinger, 100, economist
- 29 December – Oscar Schneider, 97, politician

== See also ==
- 2024 in the European Union
- 2024 in Europe
