= Nobi (disambiguation) =

Nobi were members of the slave class during the Korean dynasties of Goryeo and Joseon.

Nobi may also refer to:

- Fires on the Plain, 1951 novel released in Japan as Nobi
  - Fires on the Plain (1959 film), 1959 film adaptation of the novel
  - Fires on the Plain (2014 film), 2014 film adaptation of the novel
- Nobita Nobi, fictional character in the Doraemon series
- YRP Nobi Station, railway station in Yokosuka, Kanagawa Prefecture, Japan

== See also ==
- Nobis
- Nōbi Plain, large plain in Japan covering an area of approximately 1,800 square kilometres (690 sq mi)
