= Weider =

Weider is a German surname. Notable people with the surname include:

- Avi Zev Weider, American film director, writer, producer, and sound mixer
- Ben Weider (1923–2008), co-founder of the International Federation of BodyBuilding & Fitness
- Bjarne Odd Weider (1913–1985), Norwegian bishop
- Jim Weider, guitarist
- John Weider (born 1947), rock musician
- Joe Weider (1919–2013), Canadian bodybuilder and key developer of the profession
- Wolfgang Weider (1932–2024), German auxiliary bishop, Archbishop of Berlin
