= 2024 AfD federal party convention =

The 15th Federal Party Congress of the Alternative for Germany took place on June 29th and 30th, 2024, at the Grugahalle in Essen. Among other matters, the federal executive board was newly elected.

== Congress ==
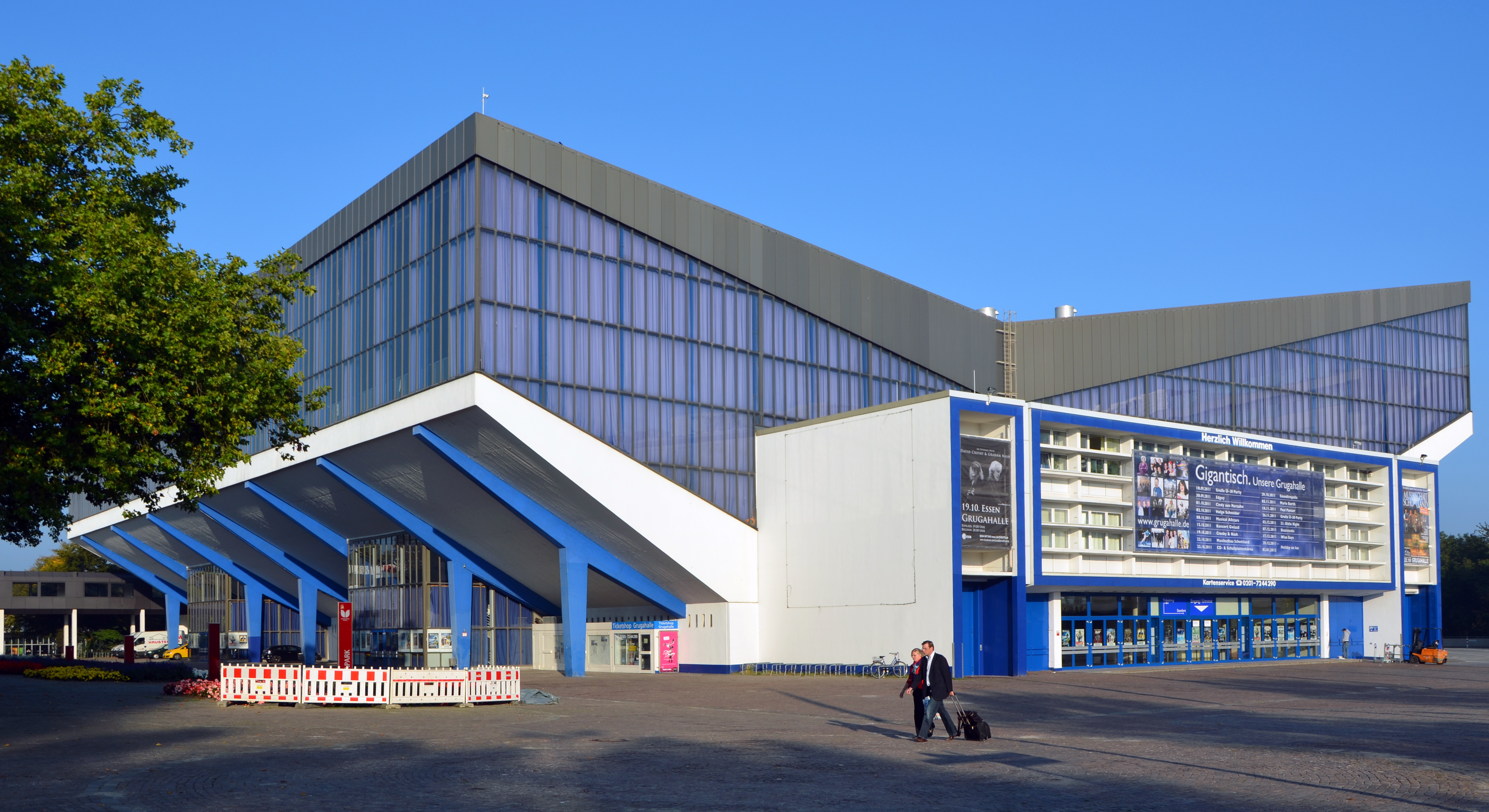
Grugahalle in Essen

The city of Essen attempted to prevent the congress at the Grugahalle, partly due to Nazi slogans from AfD members and to avoid the anticipated chaotic conditions from the congress and counter-demonstrations. On June 4th, Messe Essen terminated the rental contract with AfD following disputes over conditions regarding potential Nazi remarks by congress speakers. AfD initiated legal action and was allowed to hold their congress in Grugahalle as planned. In 2015, the significant 4th Federal Party Congress in the Essen Grugahalle occurred, which led to the strengthening of the right-wing faction that still dominates the party.

=== Executive board election ===
The federal chairs Tino Chrupalla and Alice Weidel were re-elected with significant support, with Chrupalla receiving more votes than Weidel. New to the board, among others, was Young Alternative for Germany leader Hannes Gnauck, who narrowly secured his position in the third round of voting.

Chrupalla received 82.7%, Weidel 79.8%.

Newly elected federal executive board
Position	Elected individuals
Federal Chairperson	Alice Weidel, Tino Chrupalla
Deputy Federal Chairperson	Stefan Brandner, Peter Boehringer, Kay Gottschalk (new)
Federal Treasurer	Carsten Hütter
Deputy Federal Treasurer	Alexander Jungbluth (new)
Secretary	Dennis Hohloch
Advisory Board Members	Dirk Brandes (new), Hannes Gnauck (new), Marc Jongen, Martin Reichardt, Roman Reusch, Heiko Scholz (new)

=== Other matters ===
A proposal to elect only one federal chairperson and one Secretary General instead of two federal chairpersons was narrowly rejected. with 51% of the vote.

== Counter-protests ==
Approximately 300 organizations called for protests against the congress, with some forming the coalition "Widersetzen". Some organizations advocated for active resistance and blockade of the congress, leading the Essen Police to anticipate their largest deployment in city history. Over the weekend, the area around the convention center was closed to motorists. In Essen, 32 counter-protests occurred from Friday to Sunday, with the largest event attracting about 50,000 demonstrators on Saturday afternoon, followed by approximately 25,000 in the afternoon. Smaller protest marches took place on Sunday. Essen Mayor Thomas Kufen, who sought to prevent the congress in advance, participated in the protest, which was criticized by AfD. The counter-protest against the congress was the largest demonstration ever held in Essen.

There were predominantly peaceful protests, but there were also incidents of disturbance and vandalism by left-wing extremist demonstrators, resulting in injuries to 28 police officers. Additionally, hundreds of activists attempted disruptions to prevent AfD delegates from attending the congress, leading to delays. AfD delegate Stefan Hrdy reportedly bit a demonstrator who had allegedly harassed him and spat at two SPD politicians.

Ruhrbahn temporarily renamed the U-Bahn station Messe West-Süd/Gruga to #Vielfalt as a sign of protest against AfD.
