= YRP =

YRP may refer to:

- The Turkish New Welfare Party
- The three-letter code for Ottawa/Carp Airport
- The initials for the three protagonists of the game Final Fantasy X-2: Yuna, Rikku and Paine
- Yellow Ribbon Project, a community initiative organised by the Community Action for Rehabilitation of Ex-offenders Network in Singapore
- Yokosuka Research Park
- Initials for York Regional Police
- "YRP", a song by Swans from Soundtracks for the Blind
