= Social Liberal Democratic Party =

Social Liberal Democratic Party may refer to:

- Ecological-Left Liberal Democratic Party
- Social Democratic Liberal Party
