= 2019 Hamburg borough elections =

Local elections in Hamburg, Germany

- May 26, 2019
- Turnout: 822 323 (58.0%)
	First party	Second party	Third party
Party	Greens	SPD	CDU
Last election	66 seats, 18.2%	132 seats, 35.2%	91 seats, 24.8%
Seats won	111	90	68
Seat change	▲45	▼42	▼23
Popular vote	1,241,650	953.391	722.031
Percentage	31.3%	24.0%	18.2%
Swing	▲13.1%	▼11.2%	▼6.6%
	Fourth party	Fifth party	Sixth party
Party	Left	AfD	FDP
Last election	37 seats, 10.2%	17 seats, 4.5%	10 seats, 3.9%
Seats won	40	25	23
Seat change	▲3	▲8	▲13
Popular vote	425,907	251,778	261,879
Percentage	10.7%	6.3%	6.6%
Swing	▲0.5%	▲1.8%	▲2.7%

The 2019 Hamburg borough elections were elections held in the seven boroughs of Hamburg on 26 May 2019. The Greens became the strongest party in five (later four) out of the seven boroughs.

== Electoral system ==
Similarly to the state- and prior elections, a list proportional system was used. Borough elections in Hamburg have a 3% electoral threshold.

Each voter had a total of ten votes: five constituency votes for the direct candidates in the constituency, and five at-large votes for candidates on the state lists (or for state lists in their entirety). The five votes could be amassed all on one person, party, or list (accumulation) or could be distributed/split between different candidates, parties, or lists as desired (panachage). Voting privileges were passively awarded, meaning anyone over the age of 16 meeting eligibility requirements was automatically enrolled.

== Results ==
=== All boroughs combined ===
Party	Votes	%	Seats	+/–
Alliance 90/The Greens	1,241,650	31.3	111	+45
Social Democratic Party of Germany	953,391	24.0	90	-42
Christian Democratic Union of Germany	722,031	18.2	68	-23
The Left	425,907	10.7	40	+3
Free Democratic Party	261,879	6.6	23	+13
Alternative for Germany	251,778	6.3	25	+8
Pirate Party Germany	49,522	1.2	0	-4
Free Voters	15,867	0.4	0	±0
Die PARTEI	17,972	0.5	0	±0
V-Partei^{3}	9,164	0.2	0	±0
Alliance for Innovation and Justice	8,945	0.2	0	±0
New Liberals	6,394	0.2	0	±0
Jekaterina für Eidelstedt	2,996	0.2	0	±0
Kai Debus	1,937	0.0	0	±0
National Democratic Party of Germany	1,860	0.0	0	±0
Social Liberal Democratic Movement	1,225	0.0	0	±0
HERB	742	0.0	0	±0
The German Conservatives	350	0.0	0	±0
Total votes	3,973,610	100		
Valid ballots	805 572	98.1		
Invalid/blank ballots	15,240	1.9		
Turnout	822,323	58.0		
Source: Analyse der Wahlen zu den Bezirksversammlungen in Hamburg am 26. Mai 2019

=== Hamburg-Mitte ===
Party	Party-list			Constituency			Total Seats	+/–
Party	Votes	%	Seats	Votes	%	Seats	Total Seats	+/–
Alliance 90/The Greens	137,010	29.3	7	133,810	28.8	9	16	+6
Social Democratic Party of Germany	126,364	27.0	5	132,861	28.6	9	14	-5
The Left	72,901	15.6	3	77,440	16.6	5	8	+1
Christian Democratic Union of Germany	56,654	12.1	1	60,064	12.9	5	6	-4
Alternative for Germany	35,981	7.7	2	36,034	7.7	2	4	+1
Free Democratic Party	22,667	4.8	3	22,208	4.8	0	3	+3
Pirate Party Germany	10,054	2.2	0	2,894	0.6	0	0	-2
Alliance for Innovation and Justice	5,784	1.2	0				0	±0
Total votes	467,415	100	21	465,311	100	30	51	
Valid ballots	94,812	97.6		94,331	97.3			
Invalid/blank ballots	2,294	2.4		2,655	2.7			
Turnout	97,263	46.8						
Source: Endgültiges Ergebnis der Bezirksversammlungswahl 2019: Bezirk 1 – Hamburg-Mitte

=== Altona ===
Party	Party-list			Constituency			Total Seats	+/–
Party	Votes	%	Seats	Votes	%	Seats	Total Seats	+/–
Alliance 90/The Greens	220,164	35.1	5	221,926	35.6	13	18	+6
Social Democratic Party of Germany	128,235	20.4	4	124,856	20.0	7	11	-5
Christian Democratic Union of Germany	103,998	16.6	5	109,200	17.5	4	9	-3
The Left	93,067	14.8	4	97,622	15.7	4	8	+1
Free Democratic Party	42,502	6.8	1	44,389	7.1	2	3	+1
Alternative for Germany	27,298	4.4	2	23,752	3.8	0	2	±0
Pirate Party Germany	9,079	1.4	0				0	±0
Alliance for Innovation and Justice	3,161	0.5	0				0	±0
Social Liberal Democratic Movement				1,225	0.2	0	0	±0
Total votes	627,504	100	21	622,970	100	30	51	
Valid ballots	127,393	98.4		126,464	98.0			
Invalid/blank ballots	2.082	1.6		2.594	2.0			
Turnout	129,662	63.8						
Source: Endgültiges Ergebnis der Bezirksversammlungswahl 2019: Bezirk 2 – Altona

=== Eimsbüttel ===
Party	Party-list			Constituency			Total Seats	+/–
Party	Votes	%	Seats	Votes	%	Seats	Total Seats	+/–
Alliance 90/The Greens	242,003	37.2	8	231,027	35.6	11	19	+7
Social Democratic Party of Germany	150,265	23.1	2	157,384	24.3	10	12	-6
Christian Democratic Union of Germany	106,263	16.3	2	109,722	16.9	7	9	-3
The Left	67,643	10.4	3	74,369	11.5	2	5	±0
Free Democratic Party	42,334	6.5	3	43,017	6.6	0	3	+1
Alternative for Germany	31,753	4.9	3	29,699	4.6	0	3	+1
Pirate Party Germany	10,505	1.6	0				0	±0
Jekaterina für Eidelstedt				2,996	0.5	0	0	±0
Total votes	650,766	100	21	648,214	100	30	51	
Valid ballots	132,357	98.4		131,427	98.0			
Invalid/blank ballots	2,171	1.6		2,691	2.0			
Turnout	134,839	64.8						
Source: Endgültiges Ergebnis der Bezirksversammlungswahl 2019: Bezirk 3 – Eimsbüttel

=== Hamburg-Nord ===
Party	Party-list			Constituency			Total Seats	+/–
Party	Votes	%	Seats	Votes	%	Seats	Total Seats	+/–
Alliance 90/The Greens	268,295	35.7	7	263,862	35.3	12	19	+8
Social Democratic Party of Germany	155,983	20.8	3	167,940	22.5	8	11	-6
Christian Democratic Union of Germany	131,851	17.5	4	129,046	17.3	6	10	-2
The Left	72,083	9.6	1	81,794	10.9	4	5	±0
Free Democratic Party	57,575	7.7	4	60,209	8.1	0	4	+2
Alternative for Germany	34,593	4.6	2	33.654	4.5	0	2	±0
Die PARTEI	17,972	2.4	0				0	±0
Pirate Party Germany	8,436	1.1	0	8,059	1.1	0	0	-2
V-Partei^{3}	4,221	0.6	0				0	±0
The German Conservatives	350	0.0	0				0	±0
Kai Debus				1,937	0.3	0	0	±0
HERB				742	0.1	0	0	±0
Total votes	751,359	100	21	747,243	100	30	51	
Valid ballots	152,517	98.5		151,771	98.1			
Invalid/blank ballots	2,282	1.5		2,930	1.9			
Turnout	155,034	62.9						
Source: Endgültiges Ergebnis der Bezirksversammlungswahl 2019: Bezirk 4 – Hamburg-Nord

=== Wandsbek ===
Party	Party-list			Constituency			Total Seats	+/–
Party	Votes	%	Seats	Votes	%	Seats	Total Seats	+/–
Social Democratic Party of Germany	249,609	26.7	4	251,111	27.1	9	16	-7
Alliance 90/The Greens	246,166	26.3	5	243,840	26.3	10	15	+7
Christian Democratic Union of Germany	207,652	22.2	4	219,475	23.7	9	13	+4
The Left	67,595	7.2	2	70,389	7.6	2	4	±0
Free Democratic Party	65,779	7.0	4	67,035	7.2	0	4	+2
Alternative for Germany	71,977	7.7	5	70,586	7.6	0	5	+2
Pirate Party Germany	11,448	1.2	0				0	±0
Free Voters	8,707	0.9	0	2,376	0.3	0	0	±0
V-Partei^{3}	4,943	0.5	0	1,079	0.1	0	0	±0
National Democratic Party of Germany	1,860	0.2	0	1,017	0.1	0	0	±0
Total votes	935,736	100	21	926,908	100	30	51	
Valid ballots	189,812	97.8		188,673	97.5			
Invalid/blank ballots	4,285	2.2		4,887	2.5			
Turnout	194,537	57.9						
Source: Endgültiges Ergebnis der Bezirksversammlungswahl 2019: Bezirk 5 – Wandsbek

=== Bergedorf ===
Party	Party-list			Constituency			Total Seats	+/–
Party	Votes	%	Seats	Votes	%	Seats	Total Seats	+/–
Social Democratic Party of Germany	65,895	26.4	4	65,588	26.6	8	12	-7
Christian Democratic Union of Germany	60,552	24.3	4	62,555	25.4	7	11	-3
Alliance 90/The Greens	54,572	21.9	3	54,646	22.2	7	10	+4
The Left	26,182	10.5	1	26,658	10.8	4	5	+1
Alternative for Germany	21,221	8.5	4	15,940	6.5	0	4	+2
Free Democratic Party	13,812	5.5	3	14,454	5.9	0	3	+3
Free Voters	7,160	2.9	0	6,335	2.6	0	0	±0
Total votes	249,394	100	21	246,176	100	30	51	
Valid ballots	51,098	98.2		50,461	97.0			
Invalid/blank ballots	961	1.8		1,551	3.0			
Turnout	52,159	53.6						
Source: Endgültiges Ergebnis der Bezirksversammlungswahl 2019: Bezirk 6 – Bergedorf

=== Harburg ===
Party	Party-list			Constituency			Total Seats	+/–
Party	Votes	%	Seats	Votes	%	Seats	Total Seats	+/–
Social Democratic Party of Germany	77,040	27.1	5	75,920	27.2	9	14	-6
Alliance 90/The Greens	73,440	25.8	6	71,867	25.7	8	14	+7
Christian Democratic Union of Germany	55,061	19.4	2	56,471	20.2	8	10	-4
Alternative for Germany	28,955	10.2	2	25,478	9.1	3	5	+2
The Left	26,436	9.3	3	27,150	9.7	2	5	±0
Free Democratic Party	17,210	6.0	3	19,375	6.9	0	3	+1
New Liberals	6,394	2.2	0	3,319	1.2	0	0	±0
Total votes	284,536	100	21	279,580	100	30	51	
Valid ballots	57,583	98.0		56,848	96.9			
Invalid/blank ballots	1,165	2.0		1,844	3.1			
Turnout	58,829	49.4						
Source: Endgültiges Ergebnis der Bezirksversammlungswahl 2019: Bezirk 7 – Harburg

== Aftermath ==
After the election, six members who were elected for the Green Party in Hamburg-Mitte refused to take part in the formation of the Green faction, instead opting to form their own faction named "Greens 2" (Fraktion Grüne 2). This was due to their party having levied allegations of extremism against them, after it was discovered that these members had contacts to Islamist organizations. On 2 October 2019, members of the faction Greens 2 announced that they would leave the Green party and join the SPD, which became the strongest faction in the borough through this move. Afterwards, the coalition of the SPD and Greens was dissolved in favour of a SPD-lead red-black-yellow coalition in December 2019.
