= Carsten Hütter =

German politician (born 1964)

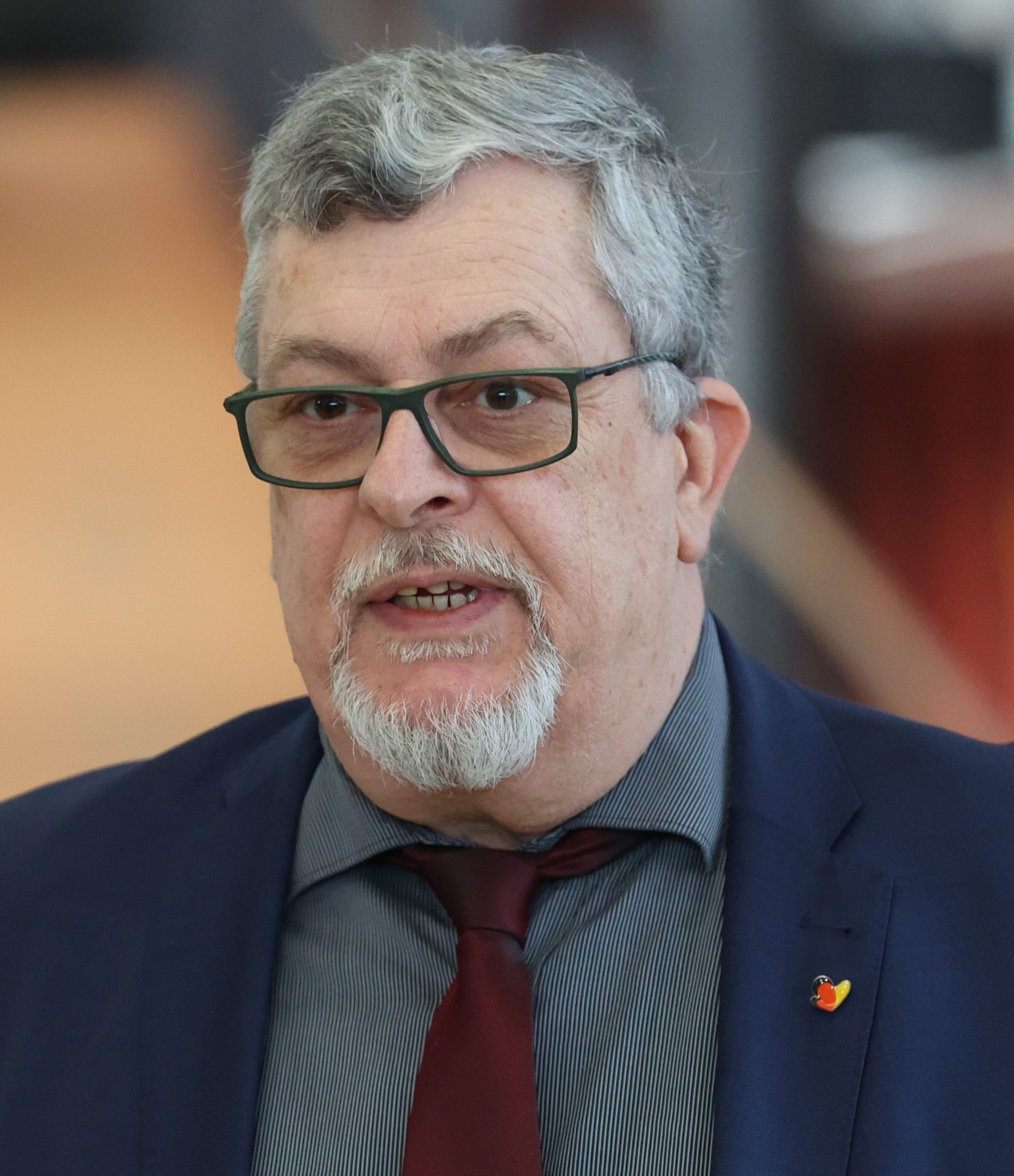
- Hütter in 2024

Member of the Landtag of Saxony
- Incumbent
- Assumed office 29 September 2014
- Constituency: Meißen 1 (2019–present)

Personal details
- Born: 19 June 1964 (age 61) Unna
- Party: Alternative for Germany (since 2013)

Carsten Paul Hütter (born 19 June 1964 in Unna) is a German politician serving as a member of the Landtag of Saxony since 2014. He has served as treasurer of the Alternative for Germany since 2020.
