= Nobis =

Nobis may refer to:

- Nobis (bishop) (fl. 9th century), a bishop of St David's
- latin for the word us

== People with the surname ==
- Beatrix Nobis (1950–2024), German art historian
- Johann Nobis (born 1899), Austrian conscientious objector
- Jörg Nobis (born 1975), German politician
- Julia Nobis (born 1992), Australian fashion model
- Tommy Nobis (born 1943), former American football player

== See also ==
- Nobi, a Korean word for a system of servitude in place between the 4th and 19th centuries
- Nōbi Plain, large plain in Japan covering an area of approximately 1,800 square kilometres (690 sq mi)
- Non nobis, a short Latin hymn used as a prayer of thanksgiving and expression of humility
