= Consulate-General of Israel, Munich =

Consulate General of Israel in Munich
- Location: Munich, Germany
- Address: Karolinenplatz, Maxvorstadt
- Opened: September 2011
- Jurisdiction: Baden-Württemberg, Bavaria, Hesse, Rhineland-Palatinate, Saarland
- Consul General: Talya Lador-Fresher
- Website: https://embassies.gov.il/munich

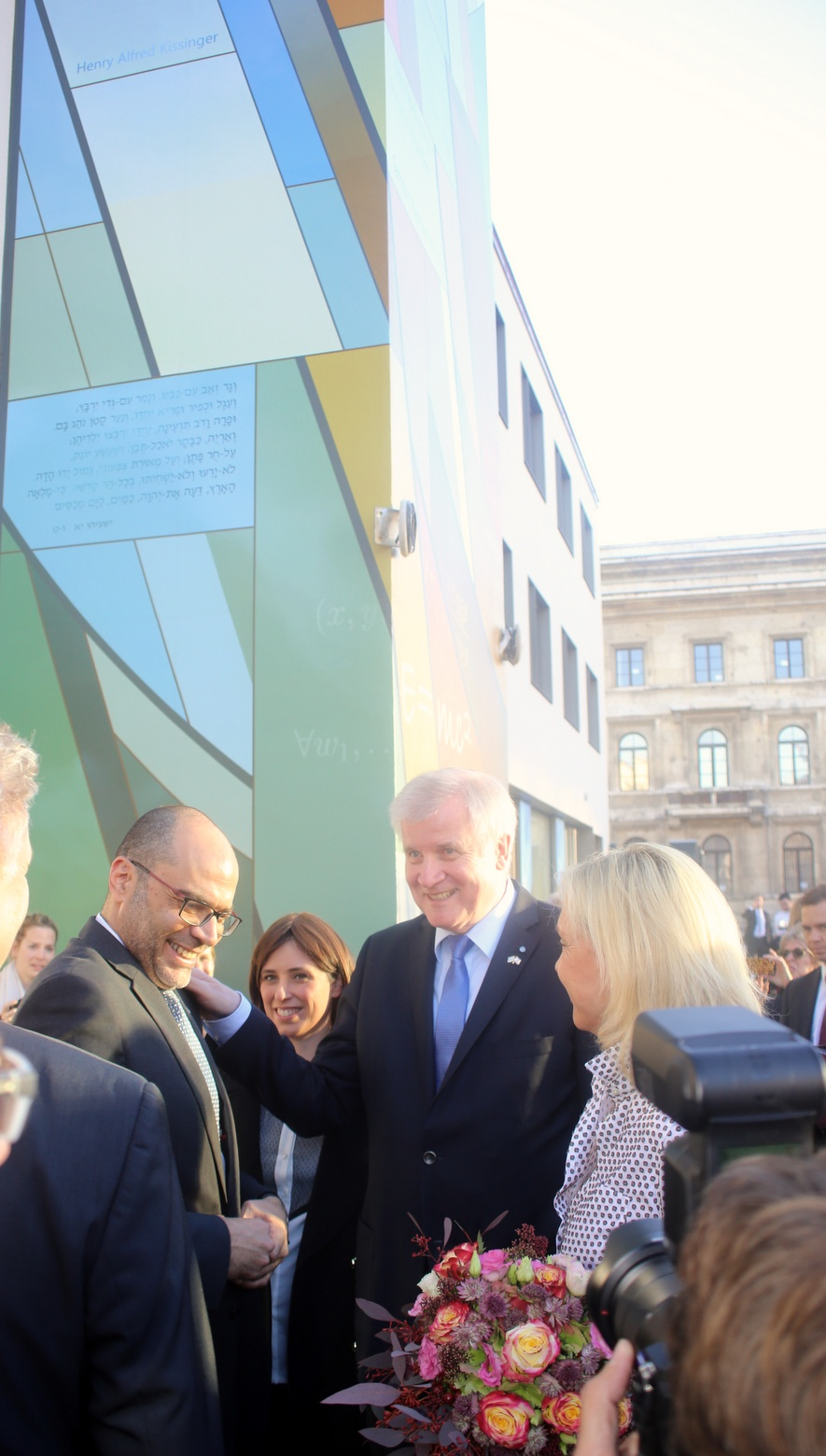
The inauguration of the Consulate General of the State of Israel's new seat, Munich (November 2015)

The Consulate General of Israel in Munich is an Israeli diplomatic mission representing the State of Israel in southern Germany. It opened in September 2011 and is responsible for diplomatic, economic, cultural, and consular relations with the German federal states of Baden-Württemberg, Bavaria, Hesse, Rhineland-Palatinate, and Saarland. The consulate general operates alongside the Embassy of Israel in Berlin and functions under the authority of the Ministry of Foreign Affairs of Israel.

As of 2024, it is the only Israeli consulate general operating within the European Union.

== History ==
=== Early Israeli diplomatic presence in Munich (1948–1953) ===
The first Israeli diplomatic mission in Germany was established in Munich in the autumn of 1948, shortly after the founding of the State of Israel. Despite Israel’s initial rejection of formal diplomatic relations with Germany following the Holocaust, an Israeli consulate was opened at Maria-Theresia-Strasse 11. The mission was not regarded as maintaining official diplomatic relations with Germany and received its accreditation through the United States.

The consulate’s primary purpose was to assist Jewish survivors of Nazi persecution, known as displaced persons (DPs), many of whom were living in camps in the Munich area, with emigration to Israel. In June 1953, the consulate was closed, and its functions were transferred to the Israel Mission in Cologne, which was established to administer reparations payments agreed upon in the Luxembourg Agreement between Israel and the Federal Republic of Germany.

=== Establishment of the Consulate General (since 2011) ===
On 8 April 2011, Bavarian Minister-President Horst Seehofer and Israeli Foreign Minister Avigdor Lieberman signed a joint declaration on the re-establishment of an Israeli consulate general in Bavaria. The Consulate General of Israel in Munich formally began operations in September 2011.

Initially, the mission was housed in temporary premises at Brienner Strasse 19 in Munich’s Maxvorstadt district. In February 2012, a trade and economic department was added, including the Israel Trade Center, operating under the Israeli Ministry of Economy and Industry. The ceremonial opening of the consulate took place on 3 July 2012.

=== Permanent headquarters at Karolinenplatz ===
In early 2014, a decision was taken to permanently locate the consulate general in a rear building owned by the Free State of Bavaria at Karolinenplatz, formerly part of the Bavarian State Lottery headquarters. The building was renovated and rebuilt at a cost of approximately €8 million, shared between Bavaria as the property owner and Israel as the tenant.

The location was chosen in part due to its historical significance. Karolinenplatz and the surrounding Maxvorstadt district served as the political and ideological center of National Socialism. The consulate stands adjacent to the former site of the NSDAP party headquarters, known as the “Brown House,” on Brienner Strasse, where the NS Documentation Center Munich opened in 2015.

The new headquarters of the Consulate General was inaugurated on 10 November 2015 in the presence of senior officials, including Israeli Deputy Foreign Minister Tzipi Hotovely. Due to construction delays, the building was occupied several months later.

== Mandate and structure ==
The consulate general is responsible for Israel’s relations with state governments, municipal authorities, political institutions, and civil society organizations in southern Germany. Its areas of activity include political dialogue, innovation and research, culture, education, tourism, and economic cooperation.

The mission comprises departments for press and public relations, innovation and research, culture, education, and trade and economy. As of 2024, it is staffed by four diplomats—the consul general, the deputy consul general, a consul, and an envoy for economics and trade—and employs approximately 30 staff members in total. The consulate general also maintains a representative office in Stuttgart.

== Economic and trade representation ==
The Consulate General of Israel in Munich hosts the Israel Economic and Trade Mission, the official representation of the Israeli economy in Germany. The mission operates as a branch of the Israeli Ministry of Economy and Industry and focuses on promoting bilateral trade, supporting Israeli exports, and fostering partnerships between Israeli and German companies. At the time of its establishment, it was also responsible for economic relations with Austria.

== Building and design ==
The consulate building is three stories high and covers approximately 1,000 square metres. Architectural elements include a staircase constructed from both Bavarian and Israeli stone. The façade features a graphic motif combining the Bavarian diamond pattern with the Star of David, as well as inscriptions of names of Jewish personalities from Germany and passages from the Hebrew Torah.

== Consuls General ==
- 2011–2013: Tibor Shalev Schlosser
- 2013–2017: Dan Shaham
- 2017–2021: Sandra Simovich
- 2021–2023: Carmela Shamir
- Since 2023: Talya Lador-Fresher

== See also ==
- Germany–Israel relations
- Foreign relations of Israel
