= 2024 Hamburg borough elections =

Local elections in Germany

← 2019	9 June 2024	Next →
- Turnout: 62.2%
	First party	Second party	Third party
Party	SPD	Greens	CDU
Last election	90 seats, 24.0%	111 seats, 31.3%	68 seats, 18.2%
Seats won	92	81	78
Seat change	▲2	▼30	▲10
Popular vote	1,078,870	1,007,380	920,653
Percentage	25.3%	23.6%	21.6%
Swing	▲1.3%	▼7.7%	▲3.4%
	Fourth party	Fifth party	Sixth party
Party	Left	AfD	FDP
Last election	40 seats, 10.7%	25 seats, 6.3%	23 seats, 6.6%
Seats won	36	34	21
Seat change	▼4	▲9	▼2
Popular vote	404,762	376,024	273,964
Percentage	9.5%	8.8%	6.4%
Swing	▼1.2%	▲2.5%	▼0.2

The 2024 Hamburg borough elections were held on 9 June 2024, the same day of the European elections. Parties and electoral lists had to be registered with the borough returning office between 3 July 2023 and 2 April 2024.

== Electoral system ==
Similarly to the state- and prior elections, a list proportional system will be used. Borough elections in Hamburg have a 3% electoral threshold.

Each voter has a total of ten votes: five constituency votes for the direct candidates in the constituency, and five at-large votes for candidates on the state lists (or for state lists in their entirety). The five votes can be amassed all on one person, party, or list (accumulation) or be distributed/split between different candidates, parties, or lists as desired (panachage). Voting privileges are passively awarded, meaning anyone over the age of 16 meeting eligibility requirements was automatically enrolled.

== Results ==
2024 Hamburg borough elections
Party	Popular vote	%	Change	Seats	Change
Social Democratic Party of Germany	1,074,423	25,3 %	+1,3 %	92	▲2
Alliance 90/The Greens	1,004,934	23,6 %	−7,7 %	81	▼30
Christian Democratic Union of Germany	917,065	21,6 %	+3,4 %	78	▲10
The Left	403,652	9,5 %	−1,2 %	40	▼4
Alternative for Germany	374,968	8,8 %	+2,5 %	34	▲9
Free Democratic Party	273,107	6,4 %	−0,2 %	21	▼2
Volt	165,397	3,9 %	+3,9 %	15	▲15
RHG - Climate protection here!	16,726	0,4 %	+0,4 %	0	0
Free Voters	14,060	0,3 %	−0,1 %	0	0
Pirate Party	8,156	0,2 %	−1,1 %	0	0
Total:	4,266,915	100 %	0 %	361	0

== See also ==
- Elections in Hamburg
- 2019 Hamburg borough elections
- 2025 Hamburg state election
