= Helmut Münch =

German politician (1939–2024)

Member of the Landtag of Saxony
- In office 1990–2004

Personal details
- Born: 5 July 1939 Golzow, Gau March of Brandenburg, Germany
- Died: 1 December 2024 (aged 85)
- Party: CDU
- Education: TU Dresden
- Occupation: Computer scientist

Helmut Münch (5 July 1939 – 1 December 2024) was a German computer scientist and politician. A member of the Christian Democratic Union, he served in the Landtag of Saxony from 1990 to 2004.

Münch died on 1 December 2024, at the age of 85.
