= Ecological-Left Liberal Democratic Party =

Ecological-Left Liberal Democratic Party Ökolinksliberale Demokratische Partei
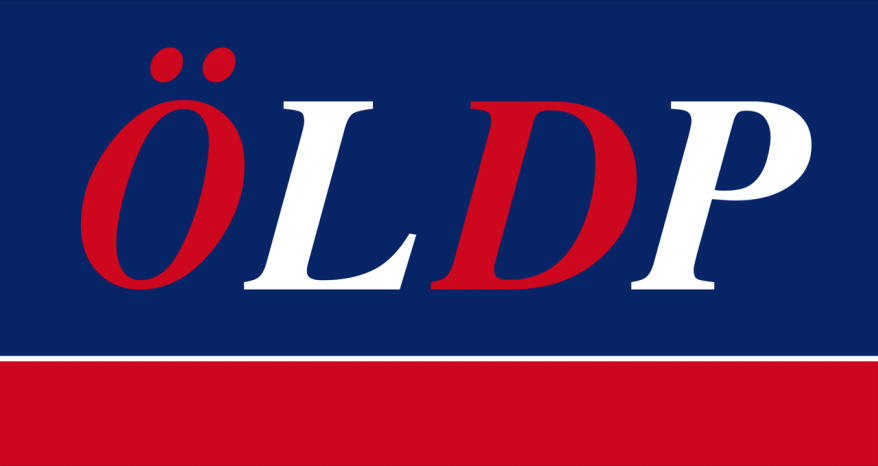
- Abbreviation: ÖLDP
- Leader: Bérangère Bultheel
- Founded: 2012
- Headquarters: Nagelshof 3, 22559 Hamburg, Germany
- Membership: 70
- Ideology: Social democracy Social liberalism Anti-fascism; Secularism; European federalism
- Political position: Centre-left

Party flag
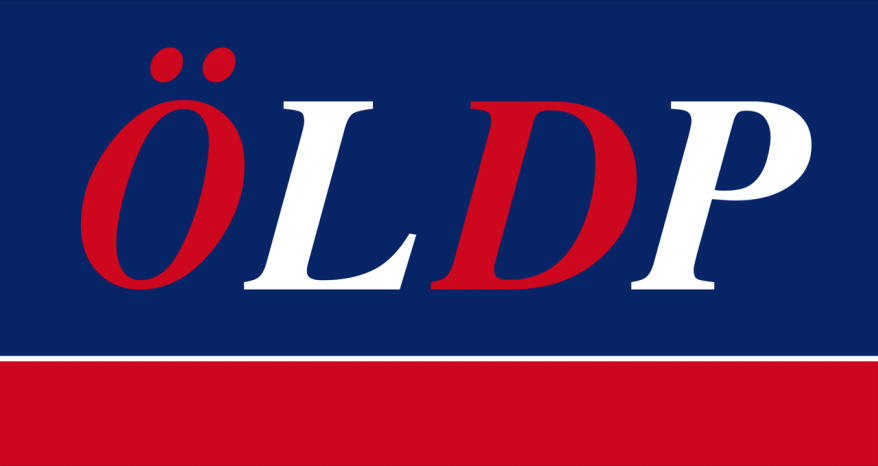

Website
- http://www.oeldp.eu/

The Ecological-Left Liberal Democratic Party (German: Ökolinksliberale Demokratische Partei) short-form: ÖLDP, formerly known as the Social Liberal Democratic Party (Sozialliberale Demokratische Partei, SLDP), is a minor party in Germany primarily active in the Hamburg borough of Altona. The party was founded by the former SPD member Bérangère Bultheel in 2012.

== Elections ==
=== Federal elections ===
Bérangère Bultheel, the founder and leader of the ÖLDP, ran as an independent in the 2017 federal election where she received 320 votes (0.0%). The ÖLDP, under its new name, participated in the 2021 federal election in the constituency of Altona, where it received 159 constituency votes (0.1%).

Year	Party list		Constituency	
Year	Votes	%	Votes	%
2021			159	0.1%

=== State elections ===
At the time known as the SLDP, the party took part in the 2020 Hamburg state election, where it received 653 votes (0.0%).

Year	HH			
Year	Party list		Constituency	
Year	Votes	%	Votes	%
2020			653	0.0
2025 (Note: Although officially running as an independent, Bérangère Bultheel appeared on the ballot with the words "ÖKOLINKSLIBERALE DEMOKRATISCHE BEWEGUNG. FREIHEITEN, FRIEDEN & WOHLSTAND FÜR ALLE! SOZIALE BEWEGUNG" before her name.)			689	0.0

=== Local elections ===
Year	HA			
Year	Party list		Constituency	
Year	Votes	%	Votes	%
2019			1,225	0.2

=== European elections ===
The at-the-time SLDP applied to take part in the 2019 European elections but was denied due to not gaining enough signatures.

== See also ==
- Left liberalism
- Hamburg-Altona
- List of political parties in Germany
- Social Democratic Party of Germany
