= Gerhard Merz =

German politician (1952–2024)

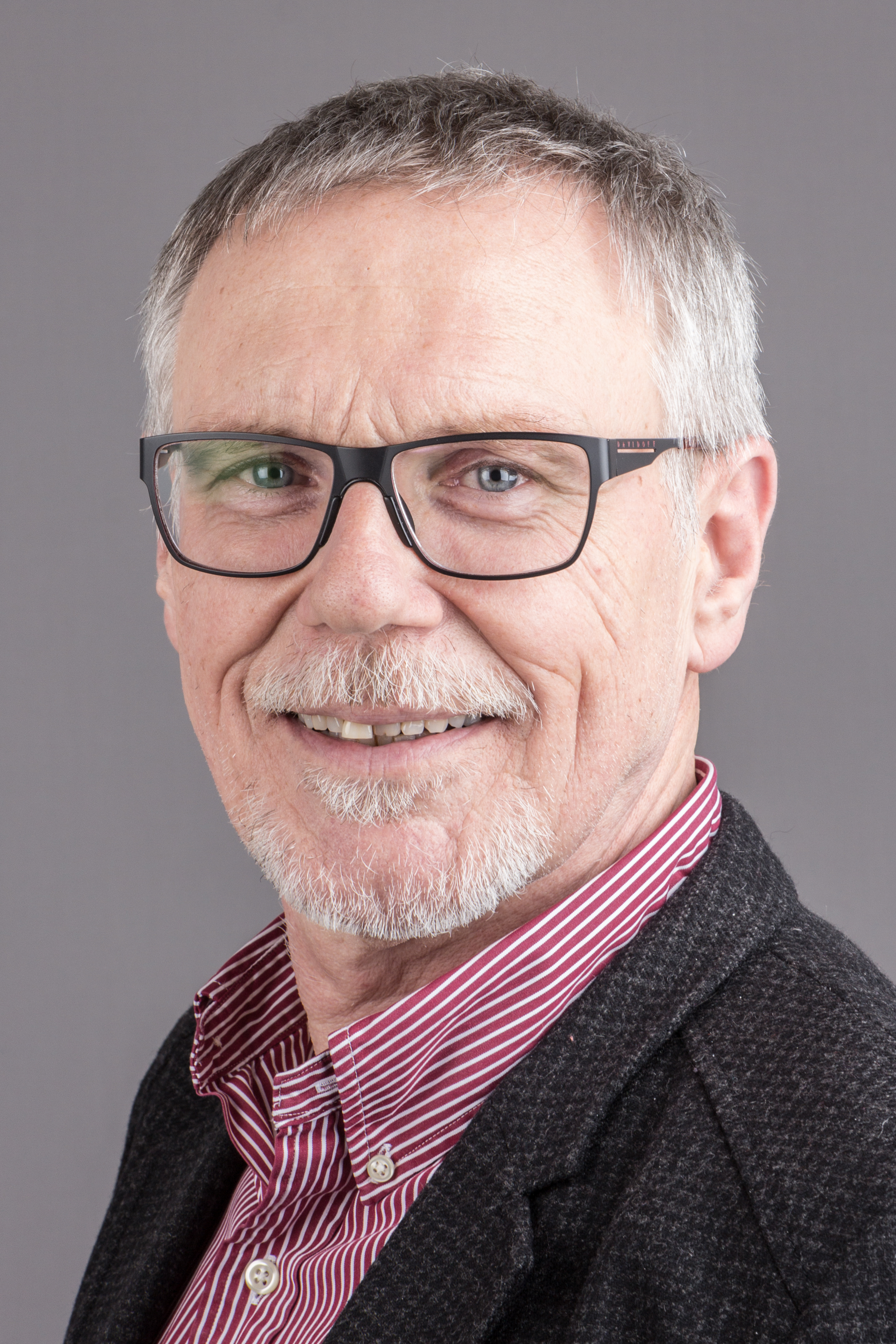
- Merz in 2016

Member of the Landtag of Hesse
- In office 27 January 2008 – 28 October 2018
- Constituency: Gießen I

Personal details
- Born: 7 July 1952 Groß-Bieberau, Hesse, West Germany
- Died: 11 June 2024 (aged 71)
- Party: SPD
- Education: University of Giessen
- Occupation: Academic

Gerhard Merz (7 July 1952 – 11 June 2024) was a German politician. A member of the Social Democratic Party, he served in the Landtag of Hesse from 2008 to 2018.

Merz died on 11 June 2024, at the age of 71.
