= Die Deutschen Konservativen =

German anti-communist voluntary association

Die Deutschen Konservativen (The German Conservatives) is a German conservative anti-communist organisation, which developed out of a conservative campaign to support Franz Josef Strauß in the 1980 federal election. Formally established circa 1986, its President was former Berlin Senator for the Interior Heinrich Lummer, and the Chairman was the well-known journalist and later Latvian MP Joachim Siegerist. The organisation was fined in 1987 for "causing offence" to former Chancellor Willy Brandt, in their condemnation of what they saw as his appeasement policies towards communism.

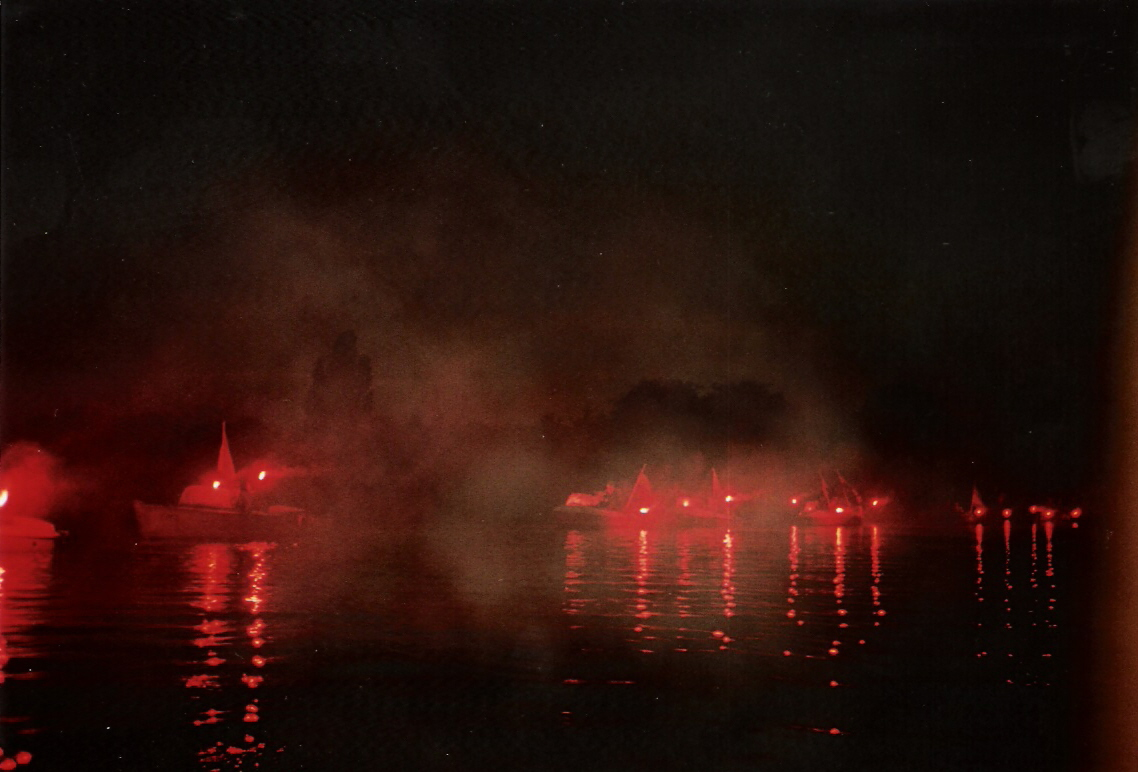
Torchlit small boat flotilla enters the lake at Mölln, near Hamburg, as part of the great anti-Communist demonstration on 12 August 1989. Each boat carries a flag of a lost province or city.

One the weekend of 12–13 August 1989, Die Deutschen Konservativen held a vast anti-communist rally at Mölln, near Lübeck, with a procession of torchlit boats down the local canal, each carrying flags of the 'lost provinces' (Silesia, East Prussia, Danzig, Sudetenland, Pomerania, etc.) with a large barge in the receiving lake holding visiting dignitaries from all over Europe, including a delegation from the UK's Western Goals Institute, who made inflammatory anti-communist speeches. These were broadcast by high-level loud-speakers across the nearby East-West border to several towns sited just across the border. Some 20,000 people gathered for the demonstration, which ended with a huge march at midnight, led by the flags of the 'lost provinces' to the ancient town centre where a further closing speech was made by Heinrich Lummer.

The association published regular newsletters and held an annual conference.
