= YRP Nobi Station =

Railway station in Yokosuka, Kanagawa Prefecture, Japan

KK68 YRP Nobi Station YRP野比駅
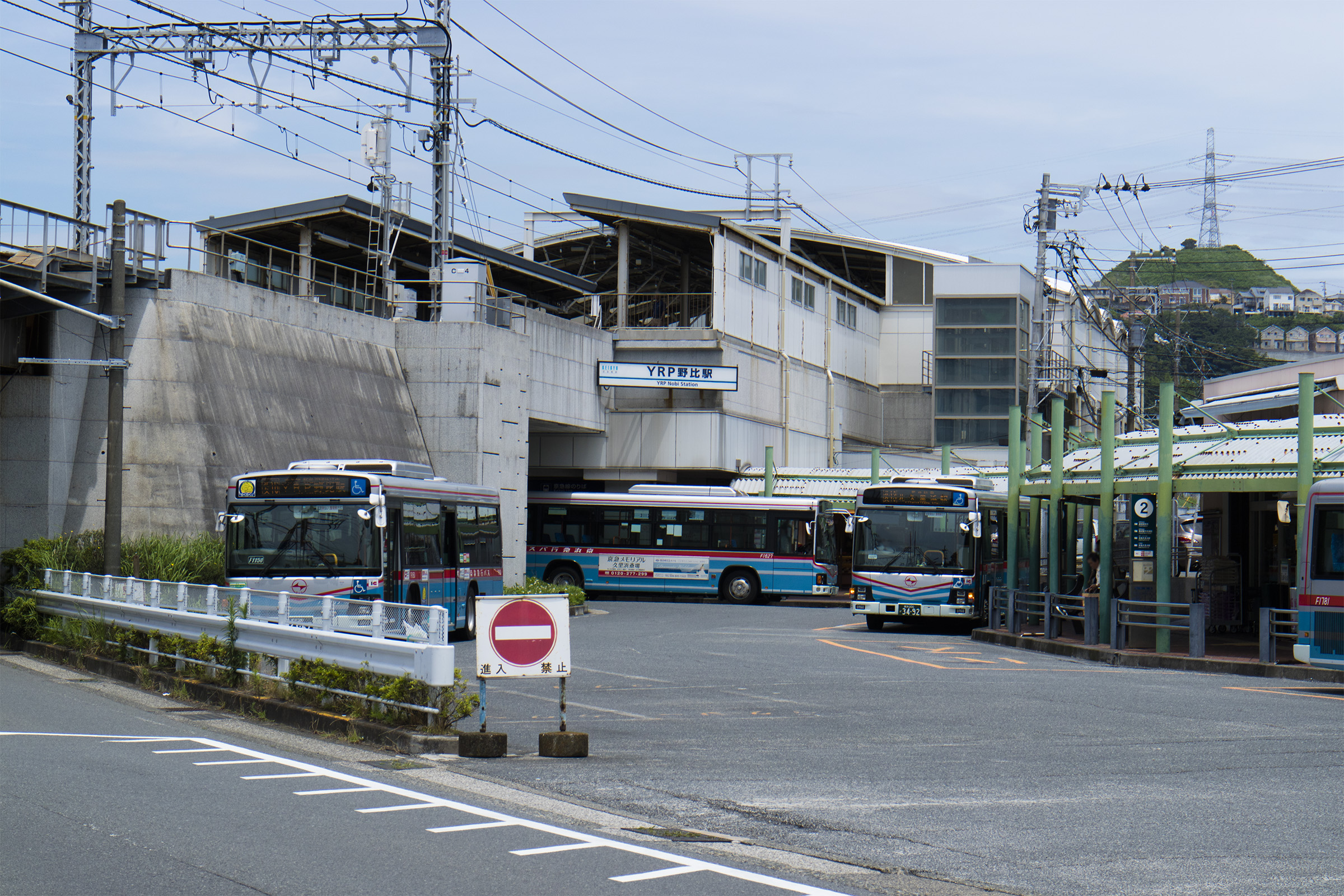
- YRP Nobi Station

General information
- Location: Nobi 1-9-1, Yokosuka-shi, Kanagawa-ken 239-0841; Japan
- Coordinates: 35°12′43.59″N 139°41′05.94″E
- Operator: Keikyū
- Line: Keikyū Kurihama Line
- Distance: 59.5 km from Shinagawa
- Platforms: 2 side platforms
- Connections: Bus stop

Construction
- Accessible: Yes

Other information
- Station code: KK68
- Website: Official website (in Japanese)

History
- Opened: 1 November 1963
- Former names: Nobi (until 1998)

Passengers
- FY2019: 18,536 daily

Services
Preceding station	Keikyu	Following station
Keikyū Nagasawa KK69 towards Misakiguchi	Evening Wing	Keikyū Kurihama One-way operation
Keikyū Nagasawa KK69 towards Misakiguchi	Kurihama Line Limited Express (Kaitoku) Limited Express (Tokkyū)	Keikyū Kurihama KK67 towards Horinouchi
Location
- Location within Kanagawa Prefecture Location within Japan

YRP Nobi Station (YRP野比駅, Waiārupī Nobi-eki) is a passenger railway station located in the city of Yokosuka, Kanagawa Prefecture, Japan, operated by the private railway company Keikyū.

== Lines ==
YRP Nobi Station is served by the Keikyū Kurihama Line and is located 7.2 rail kilometers from the junction at Horinouchi Station, and 59.5 km from the starting point of the Keikyū Main Line at Shinagawa Station in Tokyo.

== Station layout ==
The station consists of two opposed side platforms with the station building underneath. The station acts as a passing loop on the single track section of the Kurihama Line between Keikyū Kurihama Station and Keikyū Nagasawa Station.

=== Platforms ===
1	■ Keikyū Kurihama Line	for Miurakaigan and Misakiguchi
2	■ Keikyū Kurihama Line	for Keikyū Kurihama and Horinouchi; Keikyū Main Line for Yokohama, Shinagawa, and Sengakuji; Keikyū Airport Line for Haneda Airport; Toei Asakusa Line for Shimbashi and Oshiage; Keisei Oshiage Line for Aoto; Keisei Main Line for Keisei Funabashi and Narita Airport; Hokuso Line for Shin-Kamagaya and Inba-Nihon-Idai; Narita Sky Access Line for Narita Airport

== History ==
YRP Nobi Station opened on 1 November 1963 as the southern terminal station for the Kurihama Line, At that time, it was named simply Nobi Station (野比駅). It became a through station on 27 March 1966 when the Kurihama Line was extended to Tsukuihama Station. With the opening of the nearby Yokosuka Research Park, the station was renamed on 1 April 1998. It is the fourth station in Japan (and the first non-JR station) to have letters of the alphabet in its name.

Keikyū introduced station numbering to its stations on 21 October 2010; YRP Nobi Station was assigned station number KK68.

== Passenger statistics ==
In fiscal 2019, the station was used by an average of 18,536 passengers daily.

The passenger figures for previous years are as shown below.

Fiscal year	Daily average
2005	22,341
2010	20,965
2015	18,609

== Surrounding area ==
- Yokosuka Research Park
- Nobi Beach
- Nobi Shopping Street

== See also ==
- List of railway stations in Japan
