= Yokosuka Research Park =

R&D complex in Kanagawa Prefecture, Japan

Coordinates: 35°13′25″N 139°40′28″E

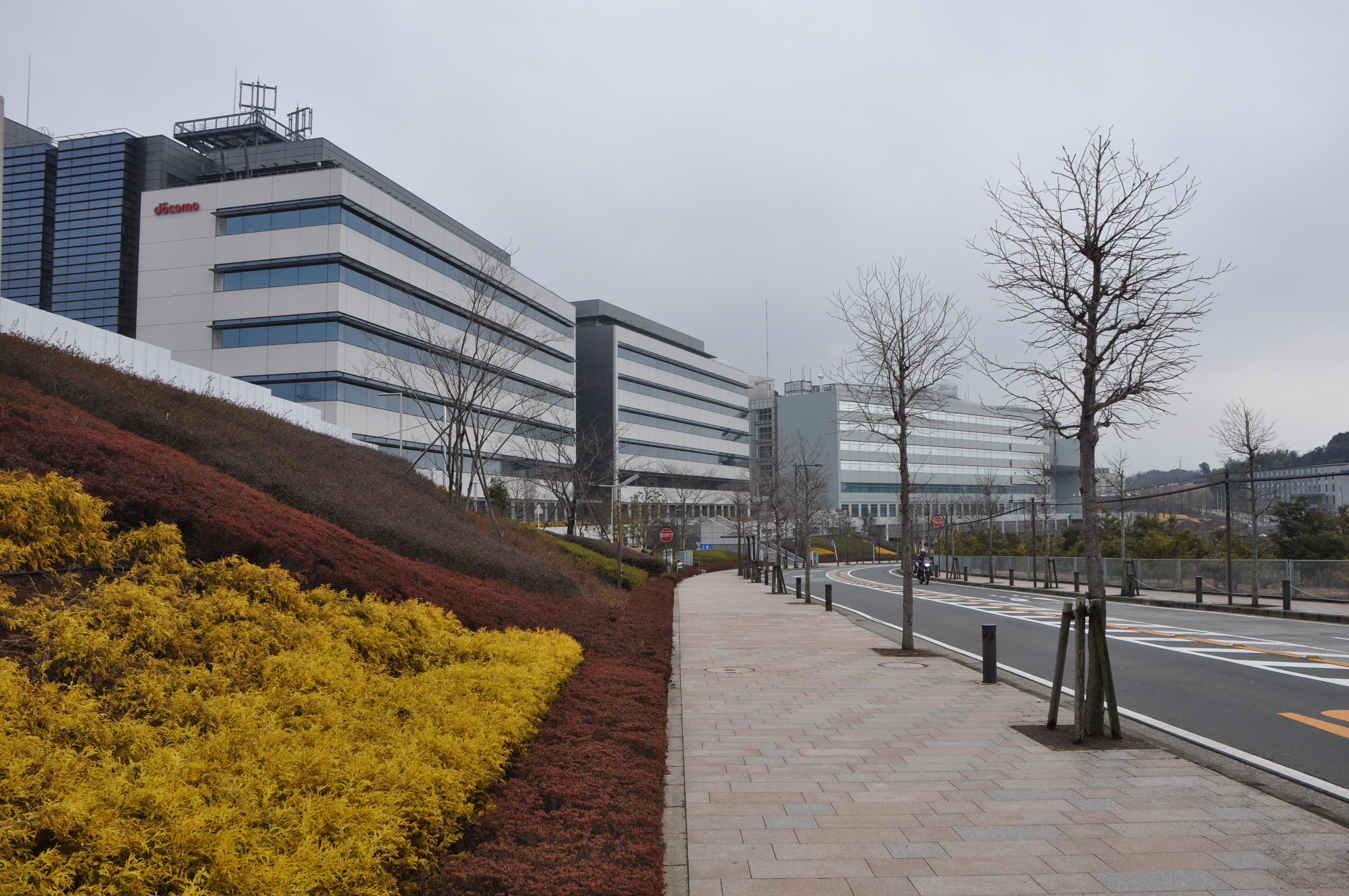
Most buildings are laid out on the north of this main road.

Yokosuka Research Park (YRP) is an area in Yokosuka City, Japan, where many of the wireless, mobile communications related companies have set up their research and development centers and joint testing facilities.

YRP was constructed during the 1990s near to NTT's Yokosuka Research & Development Center.

== History ==
- July 1987: The YRP Planning Group was established
- March 1994: The "Infrastructure Construction" Project was started
- October 1997: No. 1, No. 2 and Life Support Buildings were completed

== Major companies based in the park ==
- NTT Docomo
- Panasonic
- NEC
- Oki Electric Industry
- Denso
- Hitachi
- Mitsubishi Electric
- Toshiba
- KDDI
- Sharp Corporation
- Sony Ericsson
- Fujitsu
- Air Liquide
- National Institute of Information and Communications Technology (NICT), Japan
- V Technology Co
- Yamashin-Filter Corp

== Major buildings and facilities ==
- YRP Centers Nos. 1, 2 and 3
- YRP Venture Building
- YRP Bldg. No 5 (Fujitsu)
- NTT Yokosuka R&D Center
- Optowave Laboratory
- NTT Docomo R&D Center
- Panasonic Mobile Communications' YRP Laboratory
- Yokosuka ITS Research Center
- NEC's YRP Technical Center
- Cafeterias: Roseteria 1 and 2
- Dormitory for Singles
- The Hotel YRP
- Mobile Communications Testing Facilities

== Transportation ==
YRP is located in Hikari no Oka, Yokosuka City, about 90 minutes by train from central Tokyo. However, there are express through trains with significantly faster access. It is served by YRP Nobi Station on the Keikyu Kurihama Line, with direct services from Shinagawa in Tokyo.

== Gallery ==
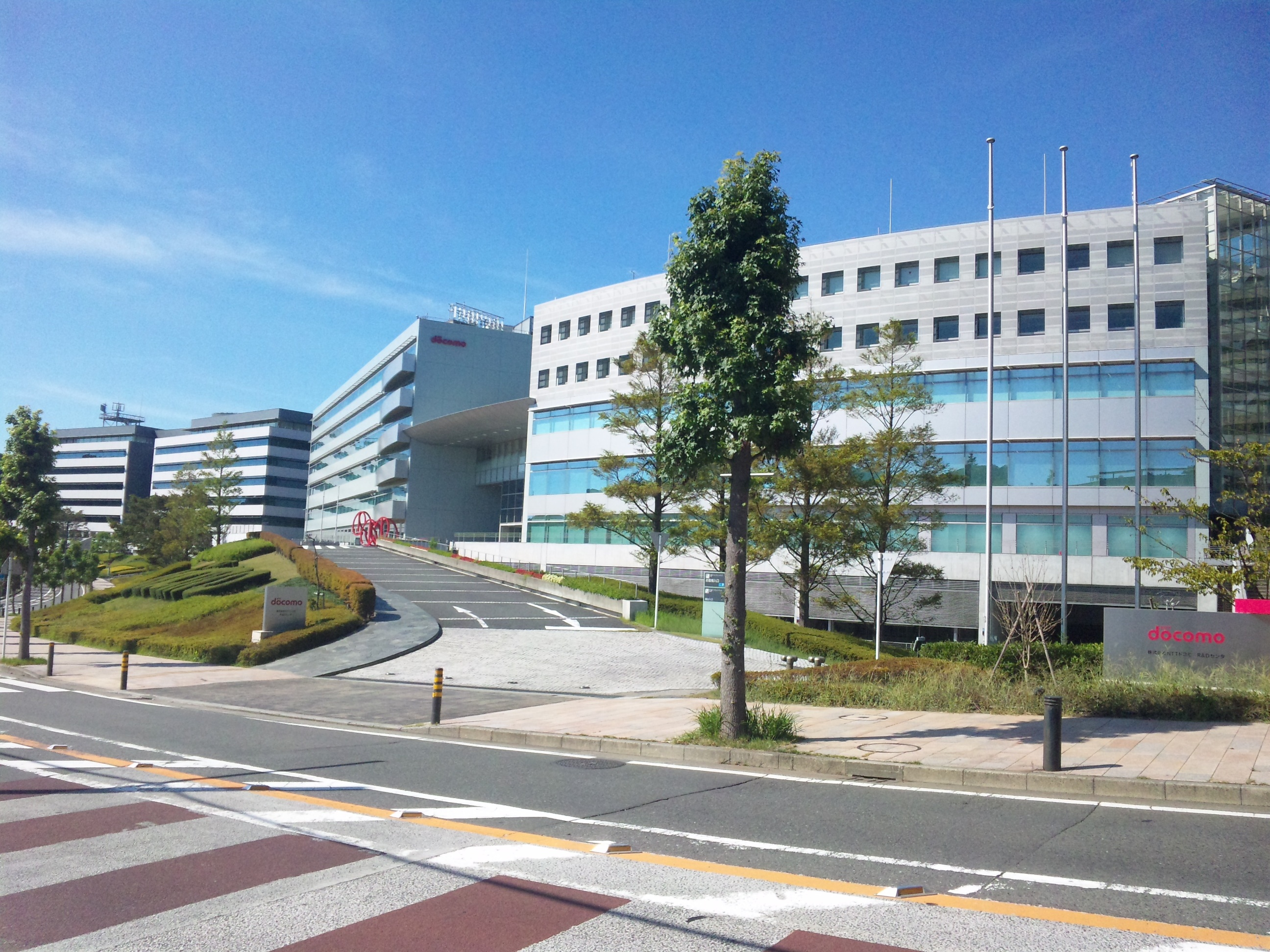
NTT Docomo R&D center

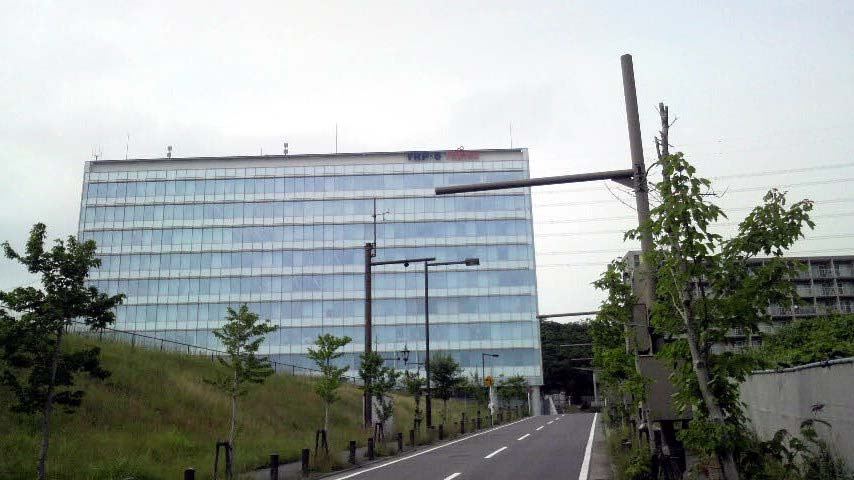
Fujitsu research center

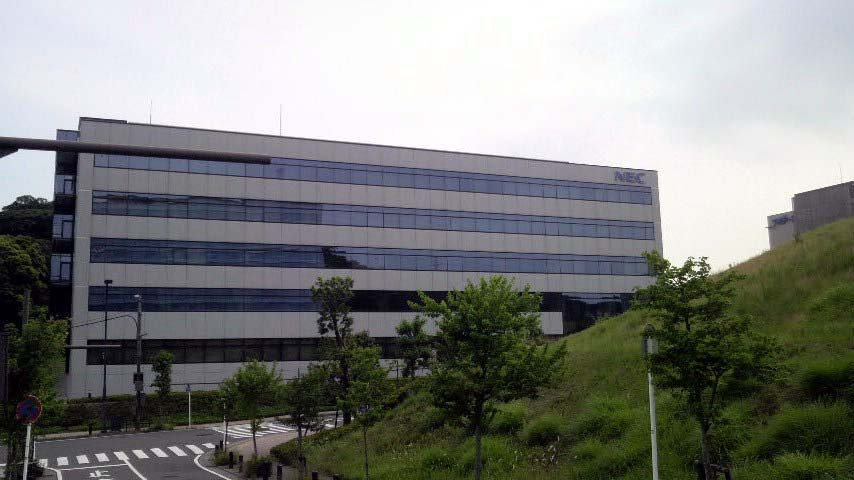
NEC YRP技術センター

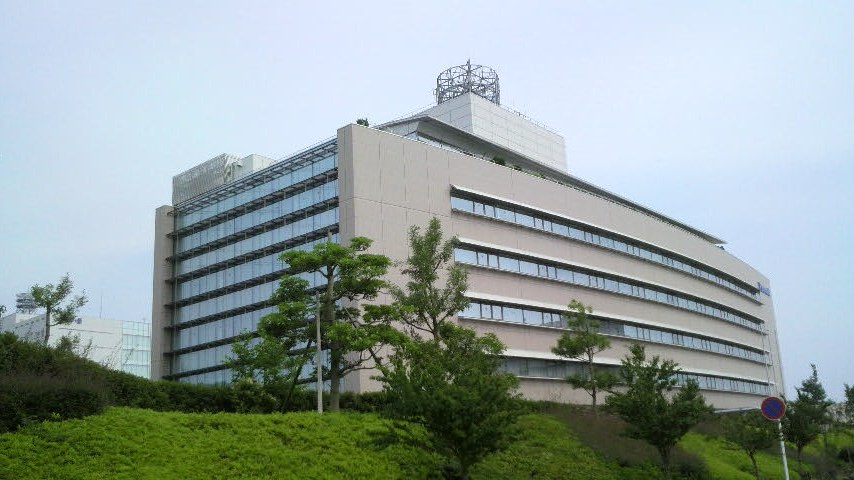
Panasonic Mobile Communications research center was closed in 2018. Now occupied by Nifco, etc.

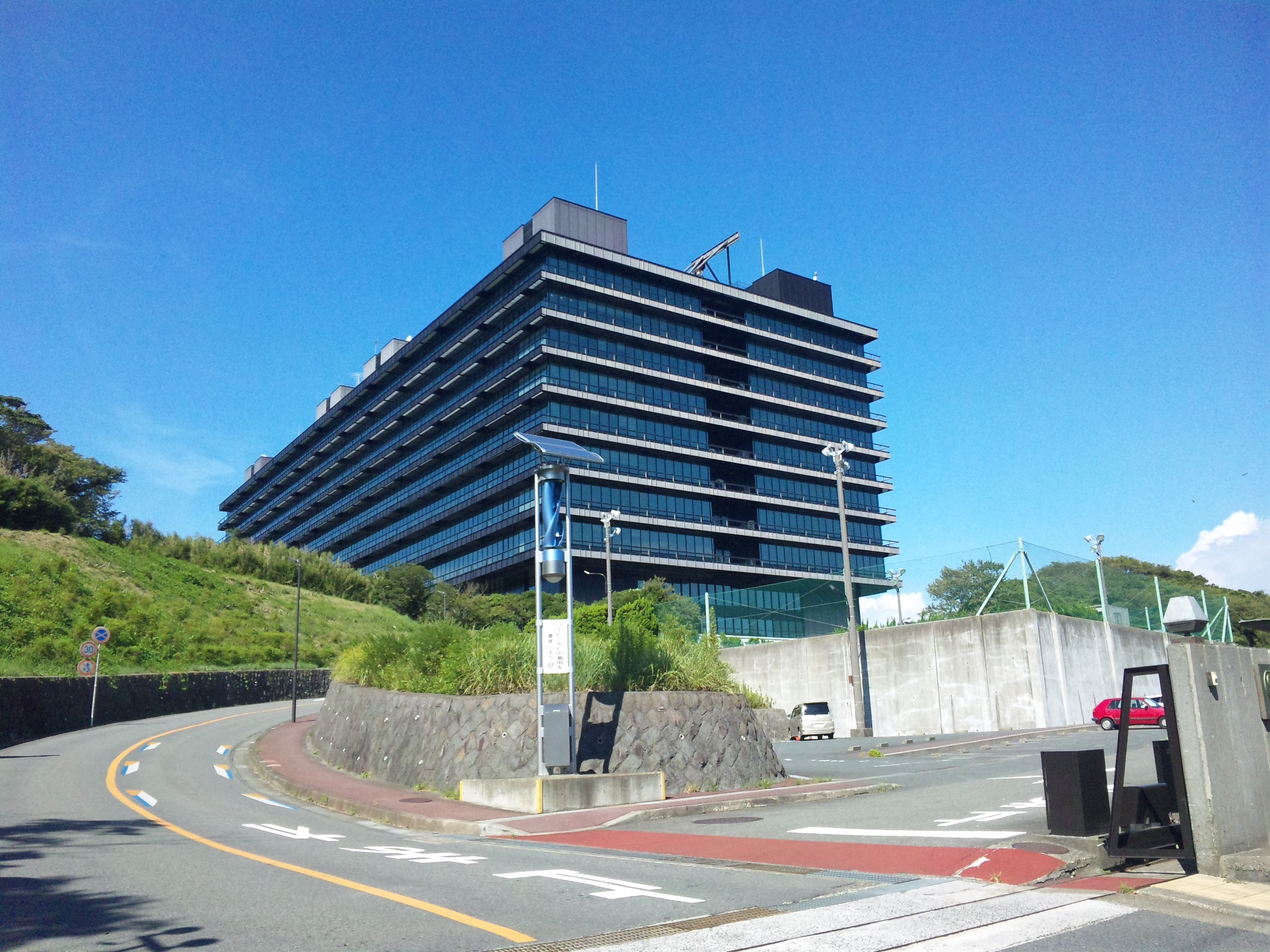
NTT Yokosuka R&D center

== See also ==
- Kansai Science City, Japan
- Silicon Valley, U.S.A.
- Zhongguancun, High Tech Zones and Software Parks (such as Dalian Software Park), China
- List of technology centers of the World
