= Willi Waike =

German politician (1938–2024)

Member of the Landtag of Lower Saxony
- In office 21 June 1982 – 20 June 1994

Personal details
- Born: 20 January 1938 Bodenwerder, Gau Southern Hanover-Brunswick, Germany
- Died: 23 June 2024 (aged 86) Bad Pyrmont, Lower Saxony, Germany
- Party: SPD
- Occupation: Paralegal

Willi Waike (20 January 1938 – 23 June 2024) was a German politician. A member of the Social Democratic Party, he served in the Landtag of Lower Saxony from 1982 to 1994.

Waike died in Bad Pyrmont on 23 June 2024, at the age of 86.
