= Reiner Uthoff =

German writer and stage director (1937–2024)

- Born: 19 September 1937; Bielefeld, Gau Westphalia-North, Germany
- Died: 5 June 2024 (aged 86)
- Education: University of Freiburg; LMU Munich
- Occupations: Writer; Stage director

Reiner Uthoff (19 September 1937 – 5 June 2024) was a German writer and stage director.

== Biography ==
Born in Bielefeld on 19 September 1937, Uthoff studied economics and sociology at the University of Freiburg and LMU Munich. He presented his dissertation, titled "Kabarett als Mittel der öffentlichen Meinungsbildung", in 1964. The following year, he founded the Rationaltheater alongside his wife, Sylvia, and his classmates, Horst Reichel and Ekkehart Kühn. He was the father of Max Uthoff.

Uthoff died on 5 June 2024, at the age of 86.

== Works ==
- Über den Bahnen der Raubvögel (1962)
- Gottes Speise ist Konfetti: 36 Gedichte ad pias causas (1962)
- Vom säugling zum bückling. Erziehung in der BRD (1972)
- Über die Unverhältnismäßigkeit von Verbrechen und Strafe in einem sozialen Rechtsstaat – Der Fall Rudolf G (1972)
- Die drei Säulen des Kapitalismus. Unterdrückung = „Knast“. Justiz = „Bonn Hur“. Ausbeutung = „Wer beschiss Salvatore“. Drei Programme vom Münchner Rationaltheater
- Tatort Vatikan (1998)
- Das Gaga Lexikon. 1000 Grundbegriffe der Politik (1998)
