= Gerhard Rödding =

German politician (1933–2024)

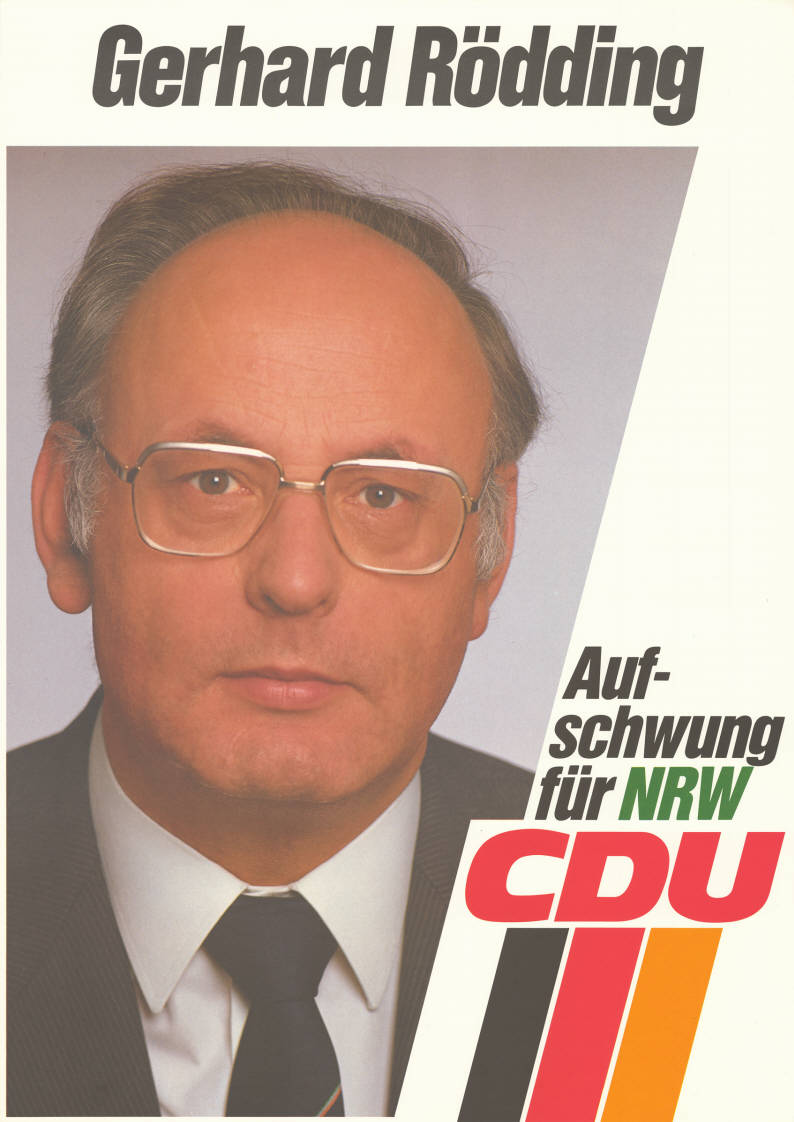
- Rödding in 1985

Member of the Landtag of North Rhine-Westphalia
- In office 29 May 1980 – 23 September 1987

Personal details
- Born: 18 February 1933 Iserlohn, Westphalia, Prussia, Germany
- Died: 7 June 2024 (aged 91)
- Party: CDU
- Education: University of Marburg; University of Göttingen; University of Münster
- Occupation: Theologian

Gerhard Rödding (18 February 1933 – 7 June 2024) was a German politician. A member of the Christian Democratic Union, he served in the Landtag of North Rhine-Westphalia from 1980 to 1987.

Rödding died on 7 June 2024, at the age of 91.
