= Jens Odewald =

German business executive (1940–2024)

Jens Odewald (21 September 1940 – 12 July 2024) was a German business executive. He was Chairman of the Board of Management of Kaufhof AG, a position he held for ten years until his dismissal in 1995. In 1996, he founded the investment company Odewald & Cie. Odewald died on 12 July 2024, at the age of 83.
