= Alexander Jungbluth =

German politician

Alexander Jungbluth MEP
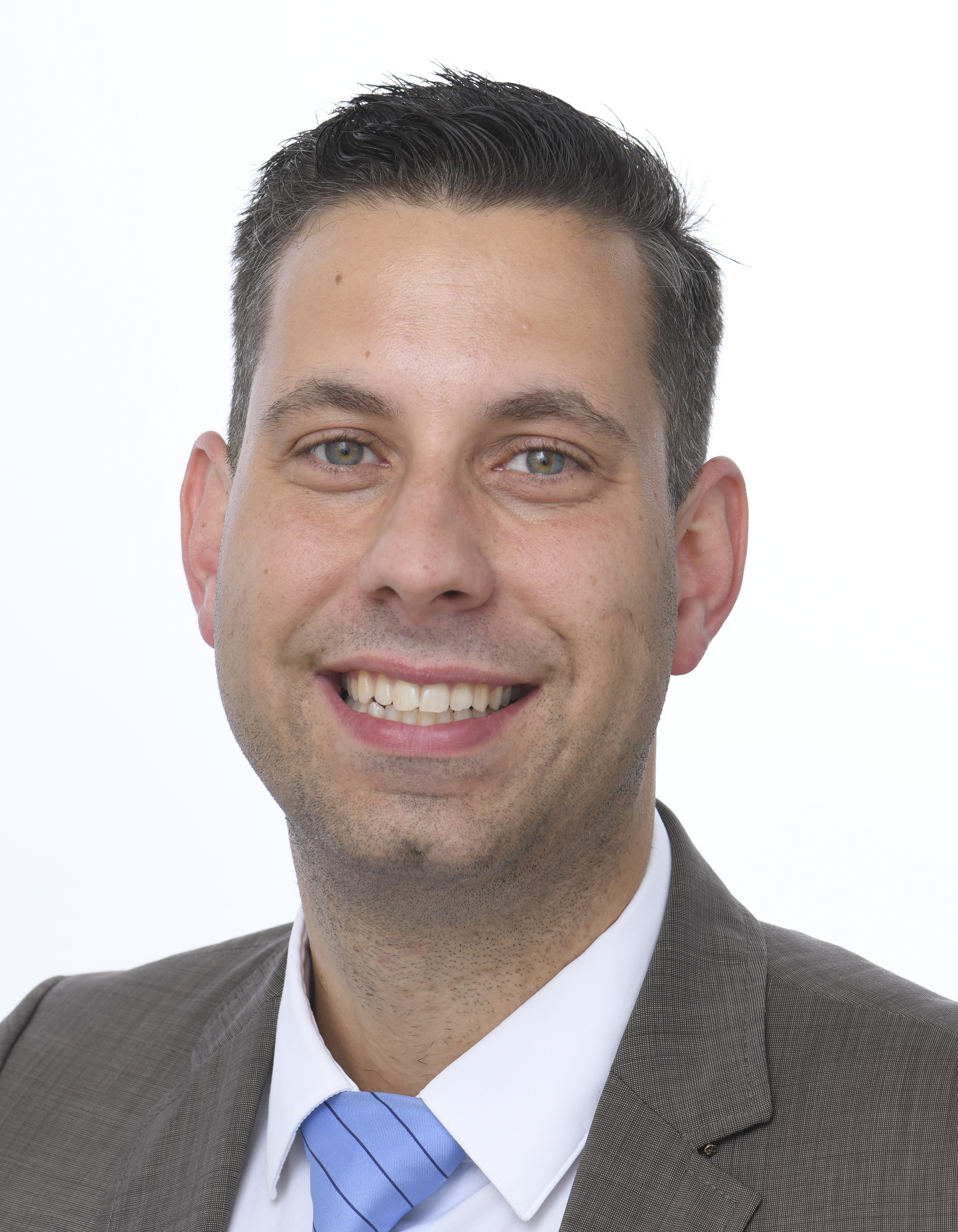

Member of the European Parliament for Germany
- Incumbent
- Assumed office 16 July 2024

Personal details
- Born: 1987; Würselen, Germany

Alexander Jungbluth (born 1987) is a German politician for the AfD party, he became a member of the European parliament on the 16 July 2024.
