= Dietrich Rusche =

German politician (1936–2024)

Member of the Hamburg Parliament
- In office 10 October 2001 – 24 February 2008

Personal details
- Born: 13 September 1936 Berlin, Germany
- Died: 6 March 2024 (aged 87) Hamburg, Germany
- Party: CDU
- Education: University of Tübingen; University of Hamburg
- Occupation: Lawyer

Dietrich Rusche (13 September 1936 – 6 March 2024) was a German lawyer and politician. A member of the Christian Democratic Union, he served in the Hamburg Parliament from 2001 to 2008.

Rusche died in Hamburg on 6 March 2024, at the age of 87.
