= Talya Lador-Fresher =

Israeli diplomat (born 1962)

- טליה לדור-פרשר
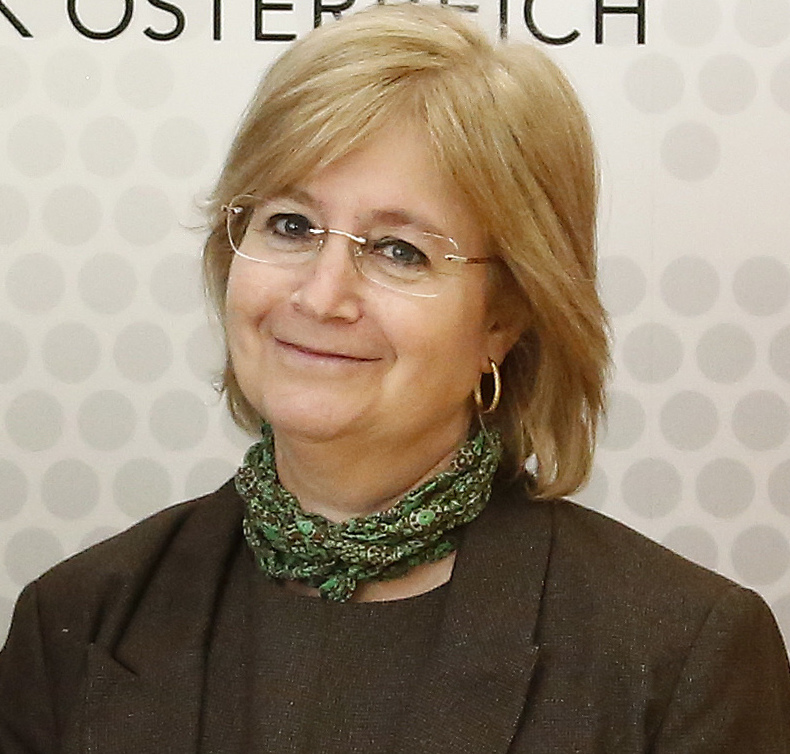

Consul General of Israel in Munich
- Incumbent
- Assumed office September 2023
- Preceded by: Carmela Shamir

Ambassador of Israel to Austria
- In office 2015–2019

Ambassador of Israel to Slovenia
- In office 2015–2019

Personal details
- Born: 1962 (age 63–64) Petah Tikva, Israel
- Education: Hebrew University of Jerusalem
- Occupation: Diplomat

Talya Lador-Fresher (Hebrew: טליה לדור-פרשר; born 1962) is an Israeli career diplomat. Since September 2023, she has served as Consul General of Israel in Munich, with responsibility for Israel’s relations with southern Germany. She previously served as Ambassador of Israel to Austria, with concurrent accreditation to Slovenia and as Israel’s permanent representative to international organizations based in Vienna.

== Early life and education ==
Lador-Fresher was born in Petah Tikva, Israel. She earned a Bachelor of Arts degree in Business Administration and Political Science from the Hebrew University of Jerusalem.

== Diplomatic career ==
Lador-Fresher joined Israel’s Ministry of Foreign Affairs in 1989. Her career has combined overseas diplomatic postings with senior positions at the Ministry’s headquarters in Jerusalem, with a focus on public diplomacy, European affairs, and state protocol.

Her early overseas service included postings at Israel’s diplomatic mission in Jamaica and at the Consulate General of Israel in New York, where she worked in information and public affairs. She later returned to Jerusalem, serving in the World Jewish Affairs Department of the Ministry of Foreign Affairs and as an adviser on world Jewish affairs at the Office of the President of Israel.

During the 2000s, Lador-Fresher held senior roles related to European and economic affairs within the Ministry of Foreign Affairs and later served at the Embassy of Israel in London as minister plenipotentiary. From 2010 to 2015, she served as Chief of State Protocol, overseeing official visits and ceremonial aspects of Israel’s foreign relations.

In 2015, she was appointed Ambassador of Israel to Austria, with concurrent accreditation to Slovenia and as Israel’s permanent representative to international organizations based in Vienna. She served in this role until 2019.

Following the completion of her ambassadorial posting, Lador-Fresher served as chargé d’affaires at the Embassy of Israel in Paris and later held a senior position within the Ministry’s European Affairs Division.

In September 2023, she assumed office as Consul General of Israel in Munich.

== Consul General in Munich ==
As Consul General, Lador-Fresher represents Israel in political, economic, cultural, and community affairs across southern Germany, including the federal states of Bavaria, Baden-Württemberg, Hesse, Rhineland-Palatinate, and Saarland.

== Personal life ==
Lador-Fresher is married and has two children.
