= Barbara Schäfer =

German politician (1934–2024)

Member of the Landtag of Baden-Württemberg for the Electoral District of Karlsruhe I
- In office 14 February 1979 – 19 April 1995

Personal details
- Born: 18 October 1934 Borken, Gau Westphalia-North, Germany
- Died: 15 June 2024 (aged 89)
- Party: CDU
- Education: University of Göttingen; University of Freiburg; University of Poitiers
- Occupation: Schoolteacher

Barbara Schäfer (18 October 1934 – 15 June 2024) was a German politician. A member of the Christian Democratic Union, she served in the Landtag of Baden-Württemberg from 1979 to 1995.

Schäfer died on 15 June 2024, at the age of 89.
