= Meißen 1 =

State electoral district of Germany

36: Meißen 1
- Electoral district for the Landtag of Saxony
- Meißen 1 in 2024
- District: Meissen
- Electorate: 43,835 (2024)
- Major settlements: Lommatzsch, Riesa, and Strehla

Current electoral district
- Party: AfD
- Member: Carsten Hütter

Meißen 1 is an electoral constituency (German: Wahlkreis) represented in the Landtag of Saxony. It elects one member via first-past-the-post voting. Under the constituency numbering system, it is designated as constituency 36. It is within the district of Meissen.

== Geography ==
The constituency comprises the towns of Lommatzsch, Riesa, and Strehla, and the municipalities of Diera-Zehren, Hirschstein, Käbschütztal, Stauchitz, and Zeithain within the district of Meissen.

There were 43,835 eligible voters in 2024.

== Members ==
Election	Member	Party	%
2014	Geert Mackenroth	CDU	39.0
2019	Carsten Hütter	AfD	36.2
2024	Carsten Hütter	AfD	41.6

== Election results ==
=== 2024 election ===
State election (2024): Meißen 1
Notes:	Blue background denotes the winner of the electorate vote. Pink background denotes a candidate elected from their party list. Yellow background denotes an electorate win by a list member, or other incumbent. A ✓ or ✗ denotes status of any incumbent, win or lose respectively.						
Party	Candidate	Votes	%	±%	Party votes	%	±%
AfD	✓ Carsten Hütter	12,688	41.6	▲5.4	12,076	39.5	▲5.2
CDU	Falk Müller	9,344	30.7	▲1.4	9,734	31.8	▲1.3
BSW	Uta Knebel	3,481	11.4		3,820	12.5	
SPD	Andreas Näther	1,700	5.6	▲0.5	1,397	4.6	▼1.9
FW	Steffen Mühlpfordt	1,039	3.4	▼3.1	583	1.9	▼2.1
Left	Markus Pohle	633	2.1	▼10.7	616	2.0	▼7.1
BD	D. Zschoke	492	1.6		194	0.6	
Greens	Volker Herold	436	1.4	▼2.8	483	1.6	▼2.5
FDP	Sven Borner	384	1.3	▼4.6	261	0.9	▼4.1
Freie Sachsen	P. Schreiber	277	0.9		667	2.2	
APT					312	1.0	
PARTEI					151	0.5	▼0.5
Values					75	0.2	
Pirates					66	0.2	
dieBasis					55	0.2	
V-Partei3					27	0.1	
Bündnis C					25	0.1	
ÖDP					24	0.1	
BüSo					14	0.0	
Informal votes		468			362		
Total valid votes		30,474			30,580		
Turnout		30,942	70.6	▲6.3			
AfD hold	Majority	3,344	10.9				

=== 2019 election ===
State election (2019): Meißen 1
Notes:	Blue background denotes the winner of the electorate vote. Pink background denotes a candidate elected from their party list. Yellow background denotes an electorate win by a list member, or other incumbent. A ✓ or ✗ denotes status of any incumbent, win or lose respectively.						
Party	Candidate	Votes	%	±%	Party votes	%	±%
AfD	Carsten Hütter	10,344	36.2	▲26.6	9,834	34.3	▲24.1
CDU	✗ Geert Mackenroth	8,369	29.3	▼9.7	8,741	30.5	▼9.1
Left	Uta Knebel	3,660	12.8	▼13.3	2,622	9.1	▼12.0
FW	Dieter Wamser	1,852	6.5		1,153	4.0	▲2.4
FDP	Sven Borner	1,683	5.9	▲1.6	1,429	5.0	▲0.6
SPD	Amrei Drechsler	1,442	5.0	▼4.1	1,840	6.4	▼4.1
Greens	Katja Meier	1,222	4.3	▼0.1	1,182	4.1	▲1.0
NPD					488	1.7	▼4.5
APT					456	1.6	▲0.6
PARTEI					290	1.0	▲0.6
Verjüngungsforschung					213	0.7	
The Blue Party					93	0.3	
Pirates					76	0.3	▼0.6
Awakening of German Patriots - Central Germany					72	0.3	
ÖDP					69	0.2	
Humanists					38	0.1	
PDV					34	0.1	
DKP					25	0.1	
BüSo					11	0.0	▼0.6
Informal votes		538			444		
Total valid votes		28,572			28,666		
Turnout		29,110	62.6	▲13.1			
AfD gain from CDU	Majority	1,975	6.9				

=== 2014 election ===
State election (2014): Meißen 1
Notes:	Blue background denotes the winner of the electorate vote. Pink background denotes a candidate elected from their party list. Yellow background denotes an electorate win by a list member, or other incumbent. A ✓ or ✗ denotes status of any incumbent, win or lose respectively.						
Party	Candidate	Votes	%	±%	Party votes	%	±%
CDU	Geert Mackenroth	9,294	39.0		9,451	39.6	
Left		6,212	26.1		5,024	21.1	
AfD		2,298	9.6		2,436	10.2	
SPD		2,163	9.1		2,509	10.5	
NPD		1,386	5.8		1,472	6.2	
Greens		1,041	4.4		751	3.1	
FDP		1,016	4.3		1,043	4.4	
FW					378	1.6	
APT					240	1.0	
Pirates		296	1.2		206	0.9	
BüSo		133	0.6		137	0.6	
Pro Germany Citizens' Movement					99	0.4	
PARTEI					88	0.4	
DSU					28	0.1	
Informal votes		655			632		
Total valid votes		23,839			23,862		
Turnout		24,494	49.5	▼0.8			
CDU win new seat	Majority	3,082	12.9				

== See also ==
- Politics of Saxony
- Landtag of Saxony
