= Helmut Peuser =

German politician (1940–2024)

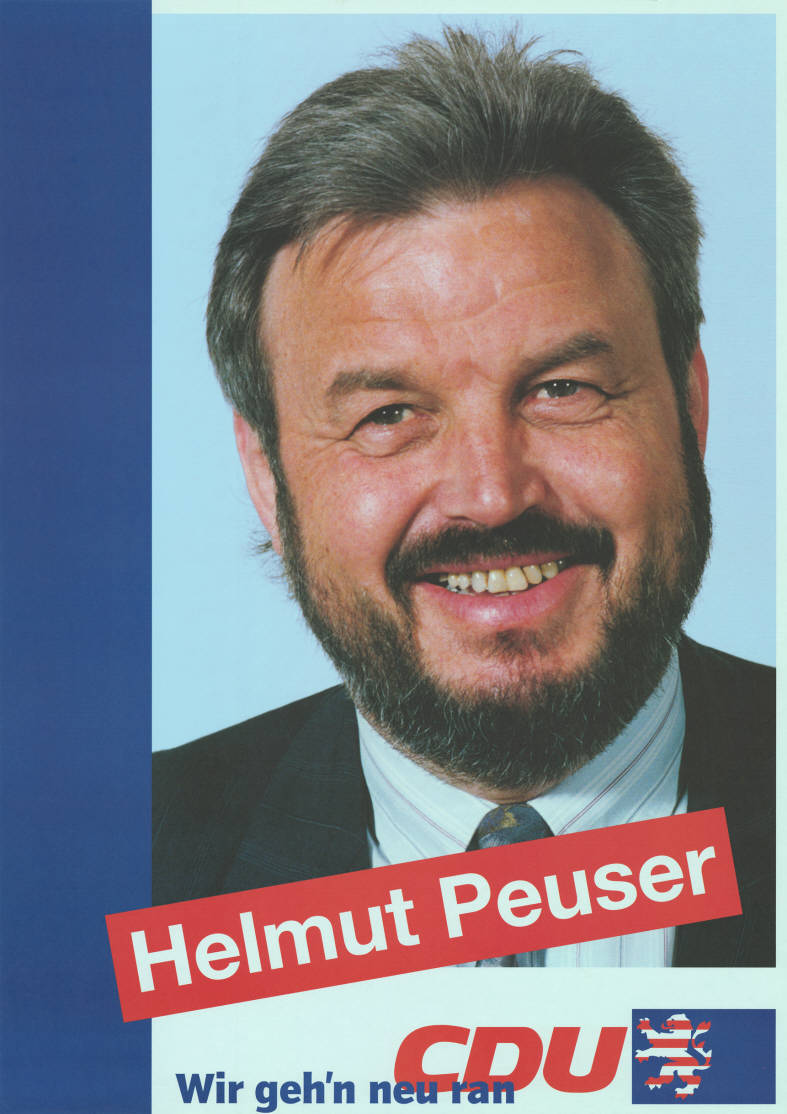
Peuser in 1999

Helmut Peuser (27 April 1940 – 30 January 2024) was a German politician. He was a member of the Christian Democratic Union of Germany (CDU), and represented the party, and a member of the Hessian state parliament (1995–2014).

Peuser died in Bad Camberg on 30 January 2024, at the age of 83.
