= Public Affairs Quarterly =

- Discipline: Public policy
- Language: English
- Edited by: Jason Brennan

Publication details
- History: 1987–present
- Publisher: University of Illinois Press on behalf of North American Philosophical Publications

Standard abbreviations
- ISO 4: Public Aff. Q.

Indexing
- ISSN: 0887-0373 (print); 2152-0542 (web)
- JSTOR: 08870373
- OCLC no.: 370745538

Links
- Journal homepage

Public Affairs Quarterly is a peer-reviewed academic journal that covers current issues in social and political philosophy. The current editor is Jason Brennan (Georgetown University).
