= Barbara Könneker =

German scholar (1935–2024)

- Born: 29 July 1935; Berlin, Nazi Germany
- Died: 9 August 2024 (aged 89); Hofheim, Hesse, Germany
- Known for: Scholar

Barbara Könneker (nee Werner; 29 July 1935 – 9 August 2024) was a German scholar of German studies.

== Life ==
She studied German. After receiving her doctorate in 1960 (Redemption motifs in the poetry of Georg Trakl) in Frankfurt am Main and her habilitation in 1965 ( Nature and transformation of the fool's idea in the age of humanism. Brant, Murner, Erasmus), she was professor of German philology at the Goethe University Frankfurt from 1971 onwards.

She died in 2024, and her funeral was held in Berlin on 20 August.

== Works ==
- Brant, das Narrenschiff. Interpretation. Munich 1966.
- Wesen und Wandlung der Narrenidee im Zeitalter des Humanismus. Brant, Murner, Erasmus. Wiesbaden 1966.
- With Conrad Wiedemann: Deutsche Literatur in Humanismus und Barock. Frankfurt 1973, ISBN 3-7997-0150-8.
- Die deutsche Literatur der Reformationszeit. Kommentar zu einer Epoche. Munich 1975, ISBN 3-538-07019-9
- Hartmann von Aue: Der arme Heinrich. Frankfurt am Main 1987, ISBN 3-425-06044-9.
- Satire im 16. Jahrhundert. Epoche – Werke – Wirkung. Munich 1991, ISBN 3-406-34760-6.
- Final thesis - Zur Interpretation der Strickerschen Tierbîspel mit Übersetzung ausgewählter Texte
