= Beatrix Nobis =

German art historian (1950–2024)

- Born: 12 June 1950
- Died: 22 June 2024 (aged 74)
- Education: University of Bonn; University of Braunschweig
- Occupation: Art historian

Beatrix Nobis (12 June 1950 – 22 June 2024) was a German art historian.

== Biography ==
Beatrix Nobis studied at the University of Bonn and the University of Braunschweig. She completed her dissertation in 1993 on the subject of Kurt Schwitters and romantic irony – a contribution to the interpretation of Merz's concept of art.

Nobis published particularly on classical modernism and contemporary art.

== Publications ==
- Beatrix Nobis, Norbert Nobis: Siegfried Neuenhausen (= Niedersächsische Künstler der Gegenwart, Neue Folge, Band 22), Braunschweig: Westermann, 1984, ISBN 978-3-14-509122-5
- Emil Cimiotti, Beatrix Nobis: Momente. Aus dem künstlerisch-wissenschaftlichen Entwicklungsvorhaben 1989/90, Katalog zur Ausstellung in der Galerie der Hochschule für Bildende Künste Braunschweig vom 4. September bis 4. Oktober 1991, Braunschweig: Galerie der Hochschule für Bildende Künste, 1991, ISBN 978-3-9803101-0-9
- Gina Gass. Arbeiten von 1984–1990, Langenhagen/Hannover: Edition Galerie Depelmann; Eutin: Galerie Schwedenkate, [1991], ISBN 978-3-928330-01-5
- Klassische Moderne aus hannoverschem Privatbesitz. 19. Januar bis 16. Februar 1992, KUBUS an der Aegidienkirche / Hannoverscher Künstlerverein, Hannover: Hannoverscher Künstlerverein, 1992
- Kurt Schwitters und die romantische Ironie. Ein Beitrag zur Deutung des Merz-Kunstbegriffes, zugleich Dissertation 1993 an der Universität Braunschweig, Alfter: VDG, Verlag und Datenbank für Geisteswissenschaften, 1993, ISBN 978-3-929742-04-6 und ISBN 978-3-95899-059-3
- Hinnerk Schrader. Werkverzeichnis, Begleitschrift anlässlich der Ausstellung Hinnerk Schrader, Zeichnen – ein Lebenswerk im Kunstverein Hannover vom 16. März bis 28. April 1996, Hannover: Kunstverein, 1996, ISBN 978-3-9805041-0-2; Inhaltsverzeichnis
- Norbert Tadeusz (= Kunst der Gegenwart aus Niedersachsen, Bd. 45), hrsg. durch die Niedersächsische Lottostiftung, Hannover: Schäfer, ca. 1997, ISBN 978-3-88746-346-5
- Klaus Dierßen, Beatrix Nobis: Karl Möllers, Ornamental, zur Ausstellung vom 25. April bis 18. Mai 2003 im Kunstverein Hildesheim, Hildesheim: Kunstverein, 2003, ISBN 978-3-935729-10-9
- Yvonne Goulbier. Pierrots paradise, aus Anlass der Ausstellung vom 27. Juni bis 19. September 2004 im Mönchehaus-Museum für Moderne Kunst Goslar, Goslar: Mönchehaus Museum für Moderne Kunst, 2004
- Christian Grohn – Frei-Raum, zur Ausstellung im imago Kunstverein Wedemark vom 15. August bis 19. September 2010, Wedemark: Imago Kunstverein, [2010]
