= Wolfgang Weider =

German Roman Catholic prelate (1932–2024)

- Auxiliary Bishop emeritus in Berlin
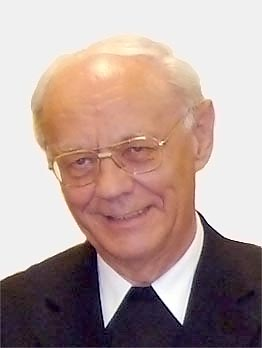
- Weider in 2007
- Archdiocese: Berlin
- Appointed: 10 February 1982
- Term ended: 18 February 2009
- Other post: Titular Bishop of Uzita (1982–2024)

Orders
- Ordination: 21 December 1957 by Julius Döpfner
- Consecration: 25 March 1982 by Joachim Meisner

Personal details
- Born: 29 October 1932 Berlin, Brandenburg, Prussia, Germany
- Died: 14 February 2024 (aged 91) Berlin, Germany

Wolfgang Weider (29 October 1932 – 14 February 2024) was a German Roman Catholic prelate. He served as auxiliary bishop of the Roman Catholic Archdiocese of Berlin from 1982 to 2009.

Weider died on 14 February 2024, at the age of 91.

Catholic Church titles
Preceded by —	Auxiliary Bishop of Berlin; 1982–2009	Succeeded by Matthias Heinrich
Preceded by Maximilian Goffart	Titular Bishop of Uzita; 1982–2024	Succeeded by Vacant
