= List of Drury University alumni =

Drury University, formerly Drury College, is a private university in Springfield, Missouri. It was originally Springfield College.

== Business ==
- Ernest R. Breech, chairman of Ford Motor Company and Trans World Airlines
- David Clohessy, director of Survivors Network of those Abused by Priests (SNAP)
- John Morris, founder and majority owner of Bass Pro Shops
- Larry O'Reilly, Rosalie O'Reilly Wooten, & David O'Reilly, founders of O'Reilly Auto Parts
- Lester E. Cox, Missouri businessman, namesake of CoxHealth

== Education ==
- Douglas W. Arner, Kerry Holdings Professor at the University of Hong Kong
- Lacey Eastburn, president of Arizona State College at Flagstaff, now Northern Arizona University, 1947–1957
- Frederic Aldin Hall, chancellor of Washington University in St. Louis 1913–1923
- J. Paul Leonard (1901–1995), university president, educator
- Kim Medley, environmental scientist at Washington University in St. Louis
- Aven Nelson, botanist who specialized in plants of the Rocky Mountains and was a founding professor and president of the University of Wyoming
- Todd Parnell, banker and former president of Drury University
- David E. Sweet, founding president of Metropolitan State University and later president of Rhode Island College
- Tom Whitlock, songwriter and lyricist best known for his Academy Award- and Golden Globe-winning song "Take My Breath Away"

== Entertainment ==
- Bob Barker, former game show host and executive producer of The Price Is Right
- David Crabtree, film critic and celebrity blogger
- Robert Cummings, film and television actor
- Danny Dark, voiceover for TV commercials as well as the voice of Superman in the Super Friends TV series
- Dabbs Greer, actor
- David Kershenbaum, iconic platinum record producer and record company executive
- Drew Kifer, actor, Clorox commercials
- Si Siman, music industry executive
- Heidi Strobel, Survivor: The Amazon contestant

== Law ==
- William Robert Collinson, United States district judge of the United States District Court for the Eastern District of Missouri and the United States District Court for the Western District of Missouri
- Timothy A. Garrison, United States attorney for the Western District of Missouri 2018–2021
- Jim Hannah, chief justice of the Arkansas Supreme Court
- Dean Whipple, Senior United States district judge of the United States District Court for the Western District of Missouri
- Paul C. Wilson, chief justice of the Missouri Supreme Court

== Military ==
- William A. Beiderlinden, U.S. Army major general
- Charles E. Fritz, captain in the United States Army Air Forces, part of the United States Strategic Bombing Survey, and scientist pioneering disaster research

== Politics ==
- Orland K. Armstrong, member of the United States House of Representatives
- Edward Barbour, served in the Missouri Senate 1935–1943 and in the Missouri House of Representatives 1923–1925
- Charles H. Brown, member of the United States House of Representatives 1957–1961
- Paul Busiek, Missouri House of Representatives
- Jim Chappell, commissioner of the Kansas City, Missouri Port Authority; and chairman of the Clay County Board of Election Commissioners
- Bob Dixon, former member of the Missouri Senate and current Greene County, Missouri presiding commissioner
- Durward Hall, member of the United States House of Representatives 1961–1973
- Susan Montee, state auditor of Missouri
- Cleveland A. Newton, member of the United States House of Representatives
- Bill Owen, member of the Missouri House of Representatives
- Jeanie Riddle, Republican member of the Missouri Senate
- James Edward Ruffin, member of the United States House of Representatives 1933–1935
- Jay Wasson, member of the Missouri Senate 2011–2019 and the Missouri House of Representatives 2002–2010
- George H. Williams, United States senator
- Karen L. Williams, U.S. ambassador to Suriname

== Religion ==
- Walter Jacob, reform rabbi and founder of Abraham Geiger College
- Marcia Mitchell, founder of Little Light House

== Science and medicine ==
- Fred S. Clinton, one of the first medical doctors in Oklahoma, built the first hospital in Tulsa
- Dorothy van Dyke Leake, botanist, botanical illustrator, educator, writer and conservationist
- Carl Richard Moore, endocrinologist noted for his studies of the reproductive tract of male mammals and the physiology of spermatozoa

== Sports ==
- Mike Carter (born 1955), American-Israeli basketball player
- Dan Glass, former president of Kansas City Royals
- Lauren Holtkamp, NBA referee
- Miranda Maverick, MMA flyweight fighter in the UFC and formerly Invicta Fighting Championships
- Ricky Meinhold, professional baseball player with the St. Louis Cardinals and the New York Mets, pitching coach for the Appalachian State Mountaineers
- Ismael Ortiz, Panamanian swimmer
- Trevor Richards, Major League Baseball pitcher for the Toronto Blue Jays
- Bill Virdon, professional baseball player and manager
- John William Yettaw, the Suu Kyi swimmer

== Writing and journalism ==
- Mary Ellen Hopkins, quilter and author
- Edna Kenton, feminist writer
- Michael Mallory, author and journalist
- Frank Peters Jr., journalist, won the 1972 Pulitzer Prize for Criticism
