= Draves =

Draves is a surname. Notable people with the surname include:

- Patricia Draves, president of Graceland University.
- Scott Draves, inventor of Fractal Flames, video artist, and VJ (video performance artist).
- Vicki Draves (1924–2010), Olympic diving gold medalist.
- W.A. Draves, Latter Day Saint leader and founder of the Church of Christ with the Elijah Message.
