= Virender K Sharma =

Virender K. Sharma
- Education: University of Delhi (B.Sc., M.Sc.); Indian Institute of Technology Delhi (M.Tech.); University of Miami (Ph.D.)
- Known for: Ferrate chemistry; Water science and technology; Liquid ferrate innovation
- Awards: Humboldt Research Award (2024); Prince Sultan Bin Abdulaziz International Prize for Water (2024); Regional Award, Southwest ACS (2024); Highly Cited Researcher (Clarivate, 2020, 2022–2024); University Distinguished Professor, Texas A&M University (2023); Bush Excellence Award for International Research (2019); Steven K. Dentel AEESP Award for Global Outreach (2020); Sigma Xi Outstanding Distinguished Scientist Award (2019)
- Scientific career
- Fields: Chemical Engineering; Environmental Engineering; Materials Engineering
- Workplaces: University of Miami; Texas A&M University; Brookhaven National Laboratory; State University of New York at Buffalo
- Website: https://people.miami.edu/profile/f585741b0eca714518175bb1ced20b52

Virender K. Sharma is an American chemist whose research focuses on ferrate chemistry, water science and technology, and environmental engineering. He is a professor of professional practice at the University of Miami College of Engineering. His work centers on the development and application of high-valent iron compounds, particularly ferrate (Fe(VI)), for water treatment, environmental remediation, and public health protection..

== Education ==
Sharma earned a Bachelor of Science in chemistry (1980) and a Master of Science in chemistry (1982) from the University of Delhi. He sebsequently completed a Master of Technology (1984) from the Indian Institute of Technology. In 1989, he received his Ph.D. in marine and atmospheric chemistry from the Rosenstiel School of Marine and Atmospheric Science at the University of Miami.

== Career ==
Following completion of his doctoral studies,Sharma held a postdoctoral fellowship at the State University of New York at Buffalo (1990–1991), where he also lectured at Millard Fillmore College. He later worked at Brookhaven National Laboratory and held visiting positions at the National Autonomous University of Mexico and Drury College.

From 1992 to 1999, he was a faculty member at Texas A&M University–Corpus Christi. He then joined the Florida Institute of Technology (1999–2013), where he directed the Center of Ferrate Excellence.

In 2014, Sharma joined Texas A&M University, where he became a professor in the School of Public Health and director of its Program of the Environment and Sustainability.

In 2025, Sharma joined the University of Miami College of Engineering as a professor of professional practice.

He has also held visiting research appointments at the University of Paris-Est, Palacký University in the Czech Republic, the Chinese Academy of Sciences, and Stanford University.

== Research ==
Sharma is known for his contributions to the chemistry and application of ferrate compounds in water and wastewater treatment. His research has examined the mechanisms of ferrate oxidation and the development of processes for producing stable liquid ferrate solutions. These advances have supported applications in drinking water treatment, pathogen inactivation, pollutant degradation, and control of disinfection byproducts.

His studies have addressed contaminants including pharmaceuticals, antibiotic-resistant bacteria, arsenic, nanoparticles, and microplastics. According to Expertscape, he has been ranked among leading experts globally in research related to water pollutants.

== Publications ==
Sharma has authored more than 470 peer-reviewed journal articles.According to Google Scholar, his publications have received over 48,000 citations, and he has an h-index exceeding 100.He is the author of Oxidation of Amino Acids, Peptides, and Proteins: Kinetics and Mechanism (Wiley, 2001) and has edited volumes in environmental chemistry and water research.

Patents

He holds seven patents related to ferrate production methods and water treatment technologies, including processes for generating liquid ferrate and applications in disinfection and pollutant removal.

Awards and honors

- Humboldt Research Award (2024)
- Regional Award, American Chemical Society – Southwest (2024)
- Prince Sultan bin Abdulaziz International Prize for Water (2024)
- University Distinguished Professor, Texas A&M University (2023)
- Bush Excellence Award for International Research (2019)
- Steven K. Dentel AEESP Global Outreach Award (2020)
- Outstanding Chemist Award, ACS Orlando Section (2006)

Sharma has been named a Highly Cited Researcher by Clarivate (2020, 2022–2024). Sharma is a fellow of the American Association for the Advancement of Science, the American Chemical Society, the Royal Society of Chemistry, the European Academy of Sciences, and the International Association of Advanced Materials..In 2025, he was elected to the Academia Europaea
