= Isabella Banks Markell =

American painter

Isabella Banks Markell (1891–1980) was an American painter. Markell was born in Superior, Wisconsin. She studied at the Ecole de Beaux-Arts in the 1930s. Markell was known in particular for her many landscape paintings of New York's East River.

Her work is included in the collections of the Seattle Art Museum, Drury University and the Metropolitan Museum of Art, New York.
