= Cloyd =

Cloyd is the anglicised form of the Welsh Clwyd, referring to the River Clwyd in northeast Wales.

It may also refer to:

== Places ==
- Clwyd, the former Welsh county named for the river

== Name ==
- Cloyd Boyer (1927-2021), former right-handed pitcher and pitching coach in Major League Baseball
- Cloyd Head (1886–1969), Chicago playwright and theatrical director born in Oak Park, Illinois
- Cloyd H. Marvin (1889–1969), longest serving president of George Washington University, and the then-youngest American university president
- Cloyd A. Porter (born 1935), former member of the Wisconsin State Assembly
- Cloyd (surname), a surname carried by some families from the Clwyd area, and by some descendants of the MacLeod clan.

== Other uses ==
- 15499 Cloyd, an asteroid
- Battle of Cloyd's Mountain, May 1864, in the American Civil War
