= Todd Parnell =

- Born: Ben Parnell III; 1947 (age 78–79); Springfield, Missouri, U.S.
- Education: B.A. Drury University, 1969; MBA Dartmouth College, 1971; M.A. Missouri State University, 2010
- Occupations: Executive, author, speaker
- Title: President of Drury University
- Term: April 23, 2007 – May 31, 2013
- Predecessor: John Sellars
- Successor: David Manuel
- Spouse: Betty Squires (m. 1976)
- Children: 4
- Website: toddparnell.com

Ben "Todd" Parnell III (born 1947) is retired president of Drury University in Springfield, Missouri, co-founder and the retired CEO of THE BANK in Springfield, a community activist, an environmental advocate, an author, and keynote speaker. Parnell was sworn in as interim president at a faculty/staff meeting in Clara Thompson Hall on April 23, 2007, upon the resignation of John Sellars, Drury's fifteenth president. After a number of options were considered for the office, Parnell was formally inaugurated as Drury University's sixteenth president on April 20, 2008, by Drury's trustee-driven search committee. Parnell retired in 2013, serving his last day as president on May 31, 2013.

Parnell graduated from Drury University in 1969 with a bachelor's degree in business and economics. He then went on to earn an MBA from the Tuck School of Business at Dartmouth College in 1971. He later received a master's degree in history from Missouri State University in 2010.

Prior to his position as president of The Signature Bank, Parnell was president of Truman Bank and executive vice president of First National Bank, both located in Clayton, Missouri. Parnell has served as the board chairman of the Springfield, Missouri, Area Chamber of Commerce, member of the Springfield-Branson National Airport board, board chairman of the Community Foundation of the Ozarks, member of the Rotary Club of Southeast Springfield, treasurer of the James River Basin Partnership, treasurer of the Upper White River Basin Foundation, and board member for Missouri Bankers Association and Wonders of Wildlife.

His father was Ben Parnell Jr. Ben was founder and President of People's Bank, now Ozark Mountain Bank, in Branson, MO.

Parnell is the author of Postcards from Branson: A Century of Family Reminiscence. Parnell has also authored two other books: The Buffalo, Ben, and Me and Mom at War. Parnell was inducted into the Missouri Writer's Hall of Fame in 2012. Parnell's book series A Skunk Creek Trilogy debuted with the first installment in September 2015, titled Skunk Creek: An Ozarkian FolkTale.
