= Henry C. Alexander =

American banker

- Born: Henry Clay Alexander; August 1, 1902
- Died: December 14, 1969 (aged 67)
- Education: Vanderbilt University (BA); Yale Law School (JD)
- Occupations: Businessman; banker; lawyer
- Title: President, Chairman & CEO of J.P. Morgan & Co.; President, Chairman & CEO of Morgan Guaranty
- Spouse: Janet Hutchinson (m. 1934)
- Children: 4

Henry Clay Alexander (1 August 1902 – 14 December 1969) was an American banker who served as president, chairman, and CEO of J.P. Morgan & Co.

== Early life and education ==
Alexander was born on a farm in Murfreesboro, Tennessee, where his father ran a feed store. He graduated from Vanderbilt University in 1923 and Yale Law School in 1925.

== Career ==
=== Law career ===
After his graduation from law school, Alexander joined Davis, Polk, Wardwell, Gardiner & Reed in New York City, where he was made partner at age 32. At Davis Polk, he served as counsel to J. P. Morgan Jr. during the Nye Committee investigations and hearings on the munitions industry.

=== House of Morgan ===
In 1939, he accepted a partnership at the House of Morgan at the age of 36, and became the fourth head of the bank after J. P. Morgan, J. P. Morgan Jr., and George Whitney.

=== Creation of J.P. Morgan & Co. ===
In 1940, Alexander joined the Morgan bank with the securities firm Morgan, Stanley, and Co. to form the commercial bank and trust corporation J.P. Morgan & Co. He became the president and CEO in 1950 and chairman of the board in 1955.

In his role as CEO, Alexander broke from Morgan's established model of eschewing the solicitation of new business, instead training and stationing a group of employees known as "bird dogs" around the United States to pursue clients. In 1958, he publicly advocated for the reduction of income taxes in the United States as an economic stimulus in the wake of recession.

=== Morgan Guaranty Trust ===
Alexander is credited for revitalizing J.P. Morgan & Co. with his aggressive approach to the development of new business, and in 1959 he leveraged this influx of capital funds to merge with the Guaranty Trust Company, forming Morgan Guaranty and serving as its CEO and chairman. At the completion of the merger, Morgan Guaranty controlled $512 million in capital funds, as opposed to J.P. Morgan & Co.'s $89 million.

Alexander retired from Morgan Guaranty in 1967.

=== Other endeavors ===
Alexander served as vice chairman of the United States Strategic Bombing Survey in Europe during World War II and earned a Medal of Merit for his service. He also was the national chairman for the American-Korean Foundation.

In addition to his career in banking, Alexander served of the board of directors of General Motors, the American Viscose Corporation, and Standard Brands. He was a trustee on the boards of Presbyterian Hospital, Vanderbilt University, the Metropolitan Museum of Art, and the Alfred P. Sloan Foundation.

== Personal life ==
Alexander married Janet Hutchinson 1934. They had four children.
