= Kim Medley =

American environmental scientist

- Title: Director of Tyson Research Center at Washington University in St. Louis

Kim Medley is an American environmental scientist and the director of Tyson Research Center at Washington University in St. Louis since 2016. She is known for her work on the influence of human disturbance on the ecological and evolutionary processes of disease vectors, such as mosquitoes and their pathogens. Her work also includes examining human impacts on vector ecology understanding how human activities altered ecological processes, which further influence trajectories of evolution.

Her dissertation focused on human-mediated dispersal and its influence on gene flow and adaptive evolution, which was awarded Outstanding Dissertation, 2012-UCF College of Sciences and Excellence in Graduate Research Award. She further explored this topic and continued her study on Asian tiger mosquitoes. Medley earned a Ph.D. in conservation biology, ecology and organismal biology from University of Central Florida, an M.S. from Missouri State University, and a B.A. from Drury University. Before joining Tyson Research Center at Washington University in St. Louis, she worked as a postdoctoral research assistant at University of Central Florida and as a graduate research assistant before that.

Medley received an International Biogeography Society Travel Award in 2009. She is a biodiversity fellow at Living Earth Collaborative at Washington University since 2018.
