= Bombing of Tokyo (10 March 1945) =

Firebombing raid on Tokyo in the Pacific War

- Part of the bombing of Tokyo and air raids on Japan during the Pacific War
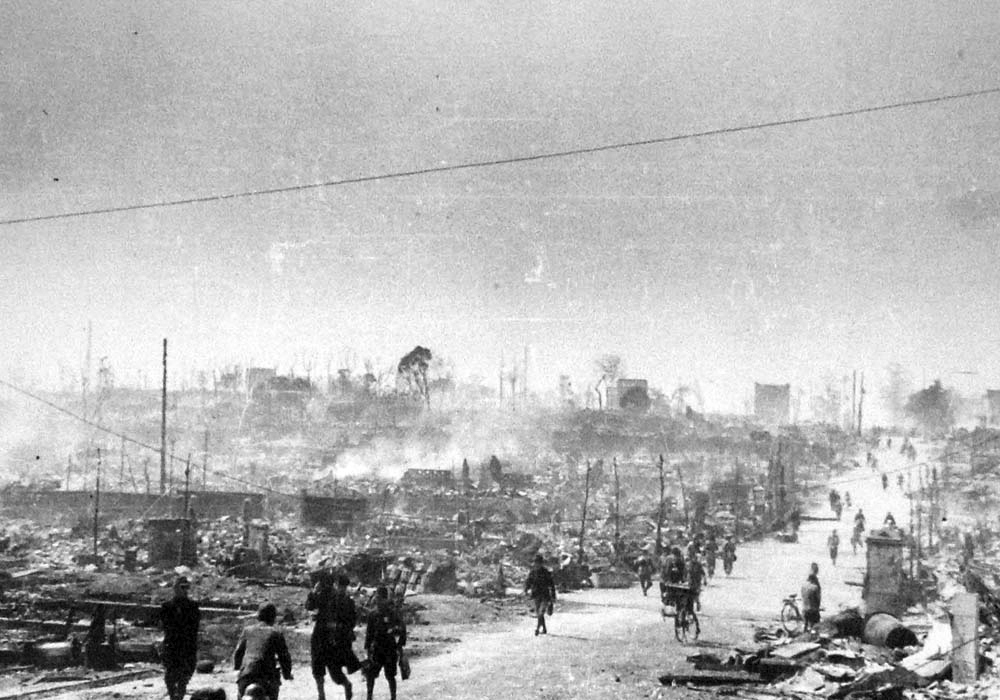
- A road passing through a part of Tokyo which was destroyed in the 10 March 1945 air raid
Date	9/10 March 1945
Location	Tokyo, Japan 35°41′58″N 139°47′47″E
Result	American victory

Belligerents
United States	Empire of Japan

Commanders and leaders
Curtis LeMay; Thomas S. Power	Shizuichi Tanaka

Units involved
XXI Bomber Command	1st Anti-Aircraft Division; 10th Air Division

Strength
325 bombers (279 bombers over target)	Approximately 638 anti-aircraft guns 90 fighter aircraft

Casualties and losses
14 aircraft destroyed 40 aircraft damaged 96 aircrew killed or missing	90,000 to 100,000 killed (most common estimates); Over one million homeless 267,171 buildings destroyed

On the night of 9/10 March 1945, the United States Army Air Forces (USAAF) conducted a devastating firebombing raid on Tokyo, the Japanese capital city. This attack was code-named Operation Meetinghouse by the USAAF and is known as the Tokyo Great Air Raid (東京大空襲, Tōkyō dai-kūshū) in Japan. Bombs, dropped from 279 Boeing B-29 Superfortress heavy bombers, burned out much of eastern Tokyo. More than 90,000 and possibly over 100,000 Japanese people were killed, mostly civilians, and one million were left homeless. This made the operation the most destructive single air attack, including the atomic bombings of Hiroshima and Nagasaki. The Japanese air and civil defenses proved largely inadequate; 14 American aircraft and 96 airmen were lost.

The attack on Tokyo was an intensification of the air raids on Japan which had begun in June 1944. Prior to this operation, the USAAF had focused on a precision bombing campaign against Japanese industrial facilities. These attacks were generally unsuccessful, which contributed to the decision to shift to firebombing. The operation during the early hours of 10 March was the first major firebombing raid against a Japanese city. The USAAF units employed significantly different tactics from those used in precision raids, including bombing by night with the aircraft flying at low altitudes. The extensive destruction caused by the raid led to these tactics becoming standard for the USAAF's B-29s until the end of the war.

There has been a long-running debate over the morality of the 10 March firebombing of Tokyo. The raid is often cited as a key example in criticism of the Allies' strategic bombing campaigns. Many historians and commentators argue that it was not acceptable for the USAAF to deliberately target civilians; other historians believe that the USAAF had no choice but to change to area bombing tactics given that the precision bombing campaign had failed. It is generally acknowledged that the tactics used against Tokyo and in similar subsequent raids were militarily successful. The attack is commemorated in Japan at two official memorials, several neighborhood memorials, and a privately owned museum.

== Background ==
Pre-war USAAF doctrine emphasized the precision bombing of key industrial facilities over area bombing of cities. Early American strategic bombing attacks on Germany used precision tactics, with the bomber crews seeking to visually identify their targets. This proved difficult to achieve in practice. During the last 20 months of the war in Europe, non-visual attacks accounted for about half of the American strategic bombing campaign against Germany. These included major area bombing raids on Berlin and Dresden, as well as attacks on several towns and cities conducted as part of Operation Clarion. The American attacks on Germany mainly used high-explosive bombs, with incendiary bombs accounting for only 14 percent of those dropped by the Eighth Air Force. The British Bomber Command focused on destroying German cities from early 1942 until the end of the war, and incendiaries represented 21 percent of the tonnage of bombs its aircraft dropped. Area bombing of German cities by Allied forces resulted in the deaths of hundreds of thousands of civilians and massive firestorms in cities such as Hamburg and Dresden.

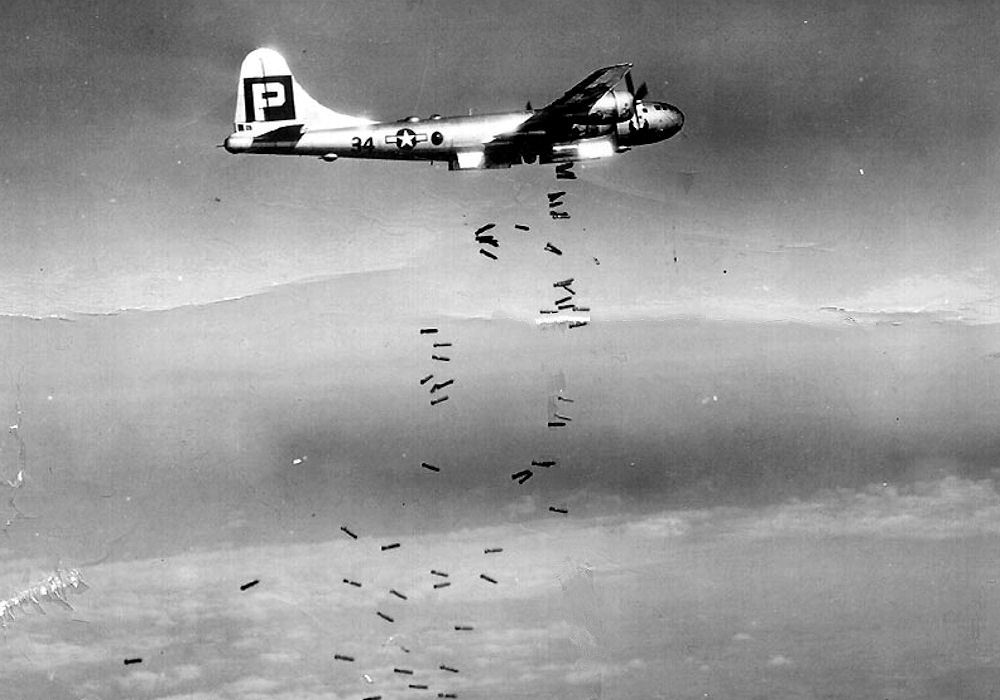
A B-29 dropping conventional bombs over Japan. The bombs are being scattered by the wind, a common occurrence which made precision bombing difficult.

Japanese forces conducted area bombing attacks on Chinese cities throughout the war. Few attempts were made to target industrial facilities, with the goal of the campaign being to terrorize civilians and cut the Chinese forces off from their sources of supplies. Chongqing, China's provisional capital, was frequently attacked by aircraft using incendiary and high explosive bombs. These raids destroyed most of the city.

The American Doolittle Raid on 18 April 1942 was the first air attack on Tokyo, but inflicted little damage on the city. In June 1944, the USAAF's XX Bomber Command began a campaign against Japan using B-29 Superfortress bombers flying from airfields in China. Tokyo was beyond the range of Superfortresses operating from China, and was not attacked. This changed in October 1944, when the B-29s of the XXI Bomber Command began moving into airfields in the Mariana Islands. These islands were close enough to Japan for the B-29s to conduct a sustained bombing campaign against Tokyo and most other Japanese cities. The first Superfortress flight over Tokyo took place on 1 November, when a reconnaissance aircraft photographed industrial facilities and urban areas in the western districts of the city. The remainder of Tokyo was photographed in subsequent reconnaissance flights, and these images were used to plan the 10 March raid and other attacks on urban areas.

The overall plan for the strategic bombing campaign against Japan specified that it would commence with precision bombing raids against key industrial facilities, and later include firebombing attacks on cities. The first target directive issued to the XXI Bomber Command by its parent unit, the Twentieth Air Force, on 11 November, 1944 specified that the main target was Japanese aircraft and aviation engine factories. These targets were to be attacked by precision bombing. Japanese cities were specified as the secondary target, with area bombing being authorized for use against them. The directive also indicated that firebombing raids were likely to be ordered against cities to test the effectiveness of this tactic. The Twentieth Air Force had an unusual command structure, as it was personally headed by General Henry H. Arnold, the commanding officer of the USAAF.

B-29 raids on Tokyo commenced on 24 November. The first raid targeted an aircraft engine factory on the city's outskirts, and caused little damage. XXI Bomber Command's subsequent raids on Tokyo and other cities mainly used precision bombing tactics and high explosive bombs, and were largely unsuccessful due to adverse weather conditions and a range of mechanical problems which affected the B-29s. These failures led to the head of the Command being relieved in January 1945. Major General Curtis LeMay, the commander of XX Bomber Command, replaced General Haywood S. Hansell. Arnold and the Twentieth Air Force's headquarters regarded the campaign against Japan up to that time as unsuccessful, and LeMay understood that he would also be relieved if he failed to deliver results. He believed that changing the emphasis from precision bombing to area bombing was the most promising option to turn the XXI Bomber Command's performance around.

== Preparations ==
=== Early incendiary raids on Japan ===
USAAF planners began assessing the feasibility of a firebombing campaign against Japanese cities in 1943. Japan's main industrial facilities were vulnerable to such attacks as they were concentrated in several large cities, and a high proportion of production took place in homes and small factories in urban areas. The planners estimated that incendiary bomb attacks on Japan's six largest cities could cause physical damage to almost 40 percent of industrial facilities and result in the loss of 7.6 million man-months of labor. It was also estimated that these attacks would kill over 500,000 people, render about 7.75 million homeless and force almost 3.5 million to be evacuated. The plans for the strategic bombing offensive against Japan developed in 1943 specified that it would transition from a focus on the precision bombing of industrial targets to area bombing from around halfway in the campaign, which was forecast to be in March 1945.

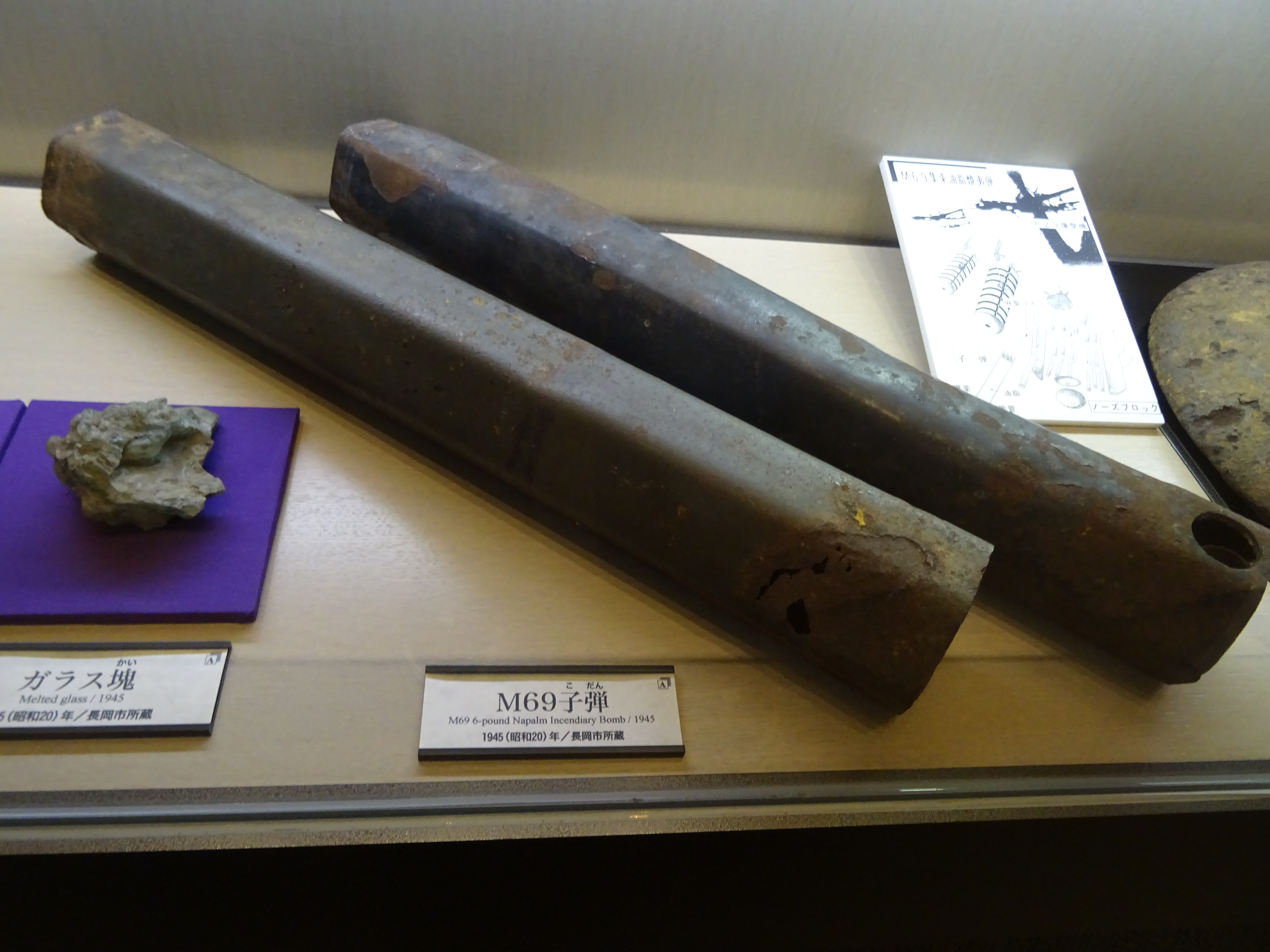
Two M69 incendiary cluster bombs on display at the Niigata Prefectural Museum of History

Preparations for firebombing raids against Japan began well before March 1945. In 1943, the USAAF tested the effectiveness of incendiary bombs on adjoining German and Japanese-style domestic building complexes at the Dugway Proving Ground. These trials demonstrated that M69 incendiaries were particularly effective at starting uncontrollable fires. These weapons were dropped from B-29s in clusters, and used napalm as their incendiary filler. After the bomb struck the ground, a fuse ignited a charge which first sprayed napalm from the weapon, and then ignited it. Prior to March 1945, stockpiles of incendiary bombs were built up in the Mariana Islands. These were accumulated on the basis of XXI Bomber Command plans which specified that the B-29s would each carry 4 short tons (3.6 t) of the weapons on 40 percent of their monthly sorties. Arnold and the Air Staff wanted to wait to use the incendiaries until a large-scale program of firebombing could be mounted, to overwhelm the Japanese city defenses.

Several raids were conducted to test the effectiveness of firebombing against Japanese cities. A small incendiary attack was made against Tokyo on the night of 29/30 November 1944, but caused little damage. Incendiaries were also used as part of several other raids. On 18 December, 84 XX Bomber Command B-29s conducted an incendiary raid on the Japanese-occupied Chinese city of Hankou which caused extensive damage. That day, the Twentieth Air Force directed XXI Bomber Command to dispatch 100 B-29s on a firebombing raid against Nagoya. An initial attack took place on 22 December which was directed at an aircraft factory and involved 78 bombers using precision bombing tactics. Few of the incendiaries landed in the target area. On 3 January, 97 Superfortresses were dispatched to firebomb Nagoya. This attack started some fires, which were soon brought under control by firefighters. The success in countering the raid led the Japanese authorities to become over-confident about their ability to protect cities against incendiary attacks. The next firebombing raid was directed against Kobe on 4 February, and bombs dropped from 69 B-29s started fires which destroyed or damaged 1,039 buildings.

On 19 February, the Twentieth Air Force issued a new targeting directive for XXI Bomber Command. While the Japanese aviation industry remained the primary target, the directive placed a stronger emphasis on firebombing raids against Japanese cities. The directive also called for a large-scale trial incendiary raid as soon as possible. This attack was made against Tokyo on 25 February. A total of 231 B-29s were dispatched, of which 172 arrived over the city; this was XXI Bomber Command's largest raid up to that time. The attack was conducted in daylight, with the bombers flying in formation at high altitudes. It caused extensive damage, with almost 28,000 buildings being destroyed. This was the most destructive raid to have been conducted against Japan, and LeMay and the Twentieth Air Force judged that it demonstrated that large-scale firebombing was an effective tactic.

The failure of a precision bombing attack on an aircraft factory in Tokyo on 4 March marked the end of the period in which XXI Bomber Command primarily conducted such raids. Civilian casualties during these operations had been relatively low; for instance, all the raids against Tokyo prior to 10 March caused 1,292 deaths in the city.

=== Preparations to attack Tokyo ===
In early March, LeMay judged that further precision bombing of Japanese industrial targets was unlikely to be successful due to the prevailing weather conditions over the country. There were on average only seven days of clear skies each month, and an intense jet stream made it difficult to aim bombs from high altitudes. Due to these constraints, LeMay decided to focus XXI Bomber Command's attacks on Japanese cities. The general directions issued to LeMay permitted such operations, which he decided on his own initiative. On 5 March XXI Bomber Command's personnel were advised that no further major attacks would be scheduled until 9 March. During this period LeMay's staff finalized plans for the attack on Tokyo. At a meeting on 7 March, LeMay agreed to conduct an intense series of raids against targets on the island of Honshu between 9 and 22 March as part of the preparations for the invasion of Okinawa on 1 April.

LeMay decided to adopt radically different tactics for this campaign. Analysis by XXI Bomber Command staff of the 25 February raid concluded that the incendiary bombs had been dropped from too high an altitude, and attacking at lower levels would both improve accuracy, and enable the B-29s to carry more bombs as the denser air at low altitude put less strain on the engines and required less weight of fuel. This would also expose them to the Japanese air defenses, but LeMay judged that poor Japanese fire control tactics meant that the additional risk was moderate. As weather conditions over Japan tended to be more favorable at night and the LORAN systems the B-29s used to navigate were more effective after dusk, it was also decided to conduct the attack at night, individually rather than in formations, as it was not possible for the B-29s to keep station without daytime visibility. Flying individually would also require less fuel, as the pilots would not need to make constant adjustments to remain in formation. USAAF intelligence had determined that the Japanese had only two night fighter units, which were believed to pose little threat, so LeMay decided to remove all the B-29s' guns and gunners other than those at the rear to reduce aircraft weight and further increase the bomb load that could be carried. All these fuel savings and other weight reductions allowed the Superfortresses to carry twice their usual bomb load.

While LeMay made the ultimate decision to adopt the new tactics, he acknowledged that his plan combined ideas put forward by many officers. On 7 March, some of the B-29 crews flew training missions during which they practiced using radar to navigate and attack a target from low altitude, without the reason being explained.

The officers who commanded XXI Bomber Command's three flying wings agreed with the new tactics, but they and some of LeMay's staff feared that they could allow heavy American casualties—XXI Bomber Command's intelligence officers predicted that 70 percent of the bombers could be destroyed. LeMay consulted Arnold's chief of staff, Brigadier General Lauris Norstad, about the new tactics, but did not formally seek approval to adopt them, later saying that he had wanted to protect Arnold from blame had the attack been a failure. LeMay notified the Twentieth Air Force headquarters of his intended tactics on 8 March, a day he knew Arnold and Norstad would be absent. There is no evidence that LeMay expected that the Twentieth Air Force would object to firebombing civilian areas, but he may have been concerned that the new tactics may have been thought too risky.

=== Japanese defenses ===
The Japanese military anticipated that the USAAF would make major night attacks on the Tokyo region. After several small night raids were conducted on the region during December 1944 and January 1945, the Imperial Japanese Army Air Force's 10th Air Division, which was responsible for intercepting attacks on the Kantō region, placed a greater emphasis on training its pilots to operate at night. One of the division's flying regiments, the 53rd Air Regiment, was also converted to a specialized night fighter unit. On the night of 3/4 March, the Japanese military intercepted American radio signals which indicated that XXI Bomber Command was conducting a major night-flying exercise. This was interpreted to mean that the force was preparing to start large-scale night raids on Japan. However, the Japanese did not expect the Americans to change to low-altitude bombing tactics.

The military forces assigned to protect Tokyo were insufficient to stop a major raid. The Eastern District Army's Kanto Air Defense Sector was responsible for the air defense of the Tokyo region, and was accorded the highest priority for aircraft and anti-aircraft guns. (Note: General Shizuichi Tanaka was the commander of the Eastern District Army.) The 1st Anti-Aircraft Division controlled the anti-aircraft guns stationed in the central region of Honshu, including Tokyo. It was made up of eight regiments with a total of 780 anti-aircraft guns, and a regiment equipped with searchlights. American military intelligence estimated that 331 heavy and 307 light anti-aircraft guns were allocated to Tokyo's defenses at the time of the raid. A network of picket boats, radar stations and lookout posts was responsible for detecting incoming raids. Due to shortages of radar and other fire control equipment, Japanese anti-aircraft gunners found it difficult to target aircraft at night. The radar stations had a short range, and fire-control equipment for the anti-aircraft batteries was unsophisticated. As of March 1945, most of the 10th Air Division's 210 combat aircraft were day fighters, with the 53rd Air Regiment operating 25 or 26 night fighters. The regiment was experiencing difficulties converting to the night fighter role, which included an overly intensive training program that exhausted its pilots.

Tokyo's civil defenses were also lacking. The city's fire department comprised around 8,000 firemen spread between 287 fire stations, but they had little modern firefighting equipment. The firefighting tactics used by the fire department were ineffective against incendiary bombs. Civilians had been organized into more than 140,000 neighborhood firefighting associations with a nominal strength of 2.75 million people, but these were also ill-equipped. The basic equipment issued to the firefighting associations was incapable of extinguishing fires started by M69s. Few air raid shelters had been constructed, though most households dug crude foxholes to shelter in near their homes. Over 200,000 houses were destroyed to create firebreaks across the city in an attempt to stop the spread of fire; however, rubble was often not cleared from the firebreaks, which provided a source of fuel. The Japanese Government had encouraged children and civilians with non-essential jobs to evacuate Tokyo, and 1.7 million had departed by March 1945. However, many other civilians had moved into Tokyo from impoverished rural areas over the same period.

== Attack ==
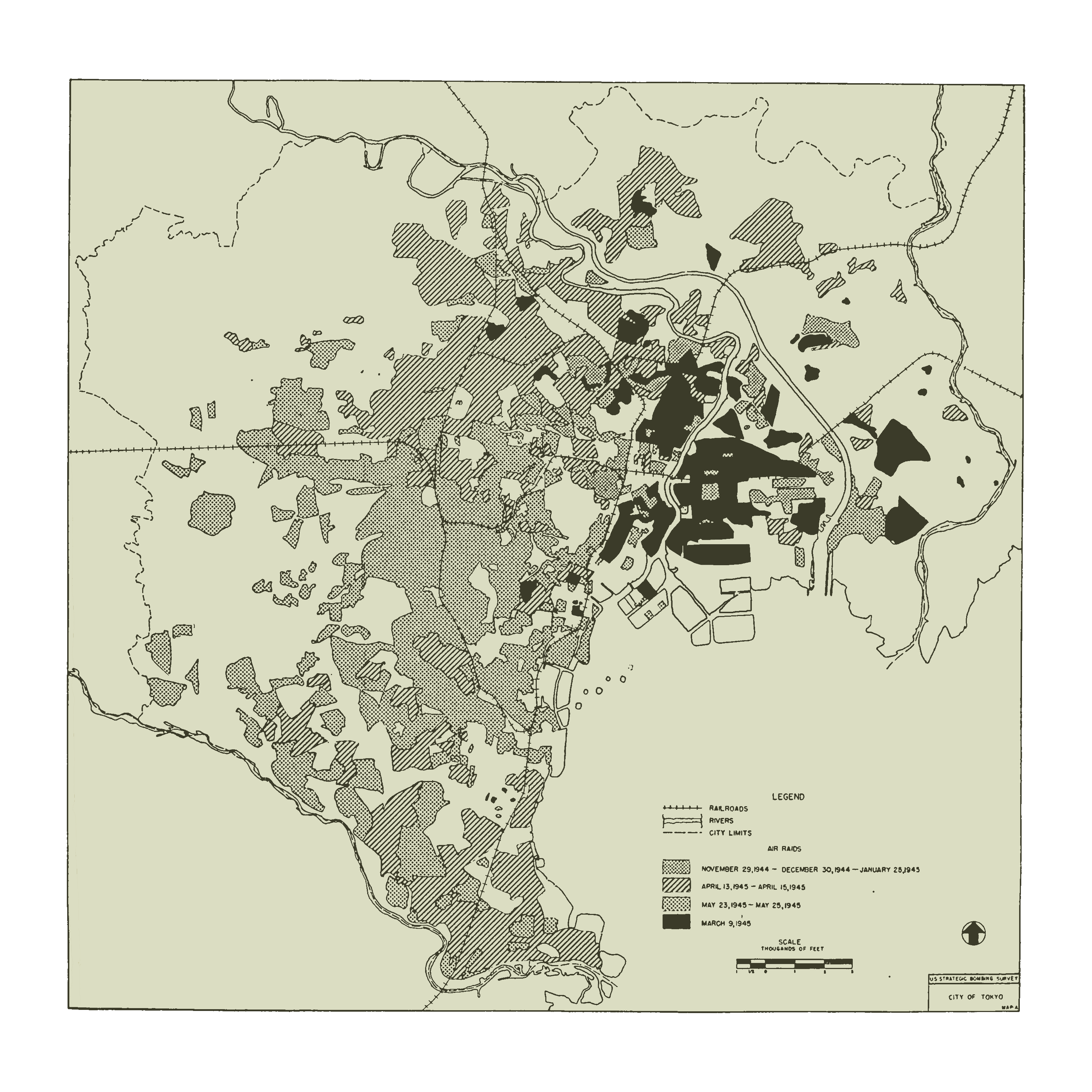
A map showing the areas of Tokyo that were destroyed during the Pacific War. The area burned out during the raid on 9/10 March is marked in black.

=== Departure ===
On 8 March, LeMay issued orders for a major firebombing attack on Tokyo the next night. The raid was to target a rectangular area in northeastern Tokyo designated Zone I by the USAAF, which measured approximately 4 by 3 miles (6.4 by 4.8 km). This area was divided by the Sumida River, and included most of Asakusa, Honjo and Fukagawa Wards. These wards formed part of the informally defined Shitamachi district of Tokyo, which was mainly populated by working-class people and artisans. With a population of around 1.1 million, it was one of the most densely populated urban areas in the world.

Zone I contained few militarily significant industrial facilities, though there were a large number of small factories which supplied Japan's war industries. The area was highly vulnerable to firebombing, as most buildings were constructed from wood and bamboo and were closely spaced. Due to this vulnerability, it had suffered extensive damage and heavy casualties from fires caused by the 1923 Great Kantō earthquake. The United States' intelligence services were aware of how vulnerable the region remained to fire, with the Office of Strategic Services rating it as containing the most combustible districts in Tokyo.

The orders for the raid issued to the B-29 crews stated that the main purpose of the attack was to destroy the many small factories located within the target area, but also noted that it was intended to cause civilian casualties as a means of disrupting production at major industrial facilities. Each of XXI Bomber Command's three wings was allocated a different altitude to bomb from, in bands between 5,000 feet (1,500 m) and 7,000 feet (2,100 m). These altitudes were calculated to be too high for the light Japanese anti-aircraft guns to reach, and below the effective range of the heavy anti-aircraft guns.

LeMay was unable to lead the raid in person as he had been prohibited from placing himself in a situation where he could be captured after being briefed on the development of atomic bombs. Instead, the attack was led by the 314th Bombardment Wing's commanding officer, Brigadier General Thomas S. Power. LeMay considered Power to be the best of the wing commanding officers. The new tactics which were to be used in the operation were not well received by many airmen, who believed that it was safer to bomb from high altitudes and preferred to retain their defensive guns. Leaving behind the unneeded gunners also troubled many of the airmen, as bomber crews typically had a very close relationship.

In preparation for the attack, XXI Bomber Command's maintenance staff worked intensively over a 36-hour period to ready as many aircraft as possible. This effort proved successful, and 83 percent of the B-29s were available for action compared to the average serviceability rate of 60 percent. Other ground crew loaded the aircraft with bombs and fuel. A total of 346 B-29s were readied. The 73rd Bombardment Wing contributed 169 B-29s and the 313th Bombardment Wing 121; both units were based on Saipan. At the time of the raid the 314th Bombardment Wing was arriving at Guam in the Marianas, and able to provide only 56 B-29s. The B-29s in the squadrons which were scheduled to arrive over Tokyo first were armed with M47 bombs; these weapons used napalm and were capable of starting fires which required mechanized firefighting equipment to control. The bombers in the other units were loaded with clusters of M69s. The 73rd and 313th Bomb Wings' Superfortresses were each loaded with 7 short tons (6.4 t) of bombs. As the 314th Bombardment Wing's B-29s would have to fly a greater distance, they each carried 5 short tons (4.5 t) of bombs.

The attack force began departing its bases at 5:35 pm local time on 9 March. It took two and three quarter hours for all of the 325 B-29s which were dispatched to take off. Turbulence was encountered on the flight to Japan, but the weather over Tokyo was good. There was little cloud cover, and visibility was good for the first bomber crews to arrive over Tokyo; they were able to see clearly for 10 miles (16 km). Conditions on the ground were cold and windy, with the city experiencing gusts of between 45 miles per hour (72 km/h) and 67 miles per hour (108 km/h) blowing from the southeast.

The first B-29s over Tokyo were four aircraft tasked with guiding the others in. These Superfortresses arrived over the city shortly before midnight on 9 March. They carried extra fuel, additional radios and XXI Bomber Command's best radio operators instead of bombs, and circled Tokyo at an altitude of 25,000 feet (7,600 m) throughout the raid. This tactic proved unsuccessful, and was later judged to have been unnecessary.

=== Over Tokyo ===
The attack on Tokyo commenced at 12:08 am local time on 10 March. Pathfinder bombers simultaneously approached the target area at right angles to each other. These bombers were manned by the 73rd and 313th Bombardment Wings' best crews. Their M47 bombs rapidly started fires in an X shape, which was used to direct the attacks for the remainder of the force. Each of XXI Bomber Command's wings and their subordinate groups had been briefed to attack different areas within the X shape to ensure that the raid caused widespread damage. As the fires expanded, the American bombers spread out to attack unaffected parts of the target area. Power's B-29 circled Tokyo for 90 minutes, with a team of cartographers who were assigned to him mapping the spread of the fires.

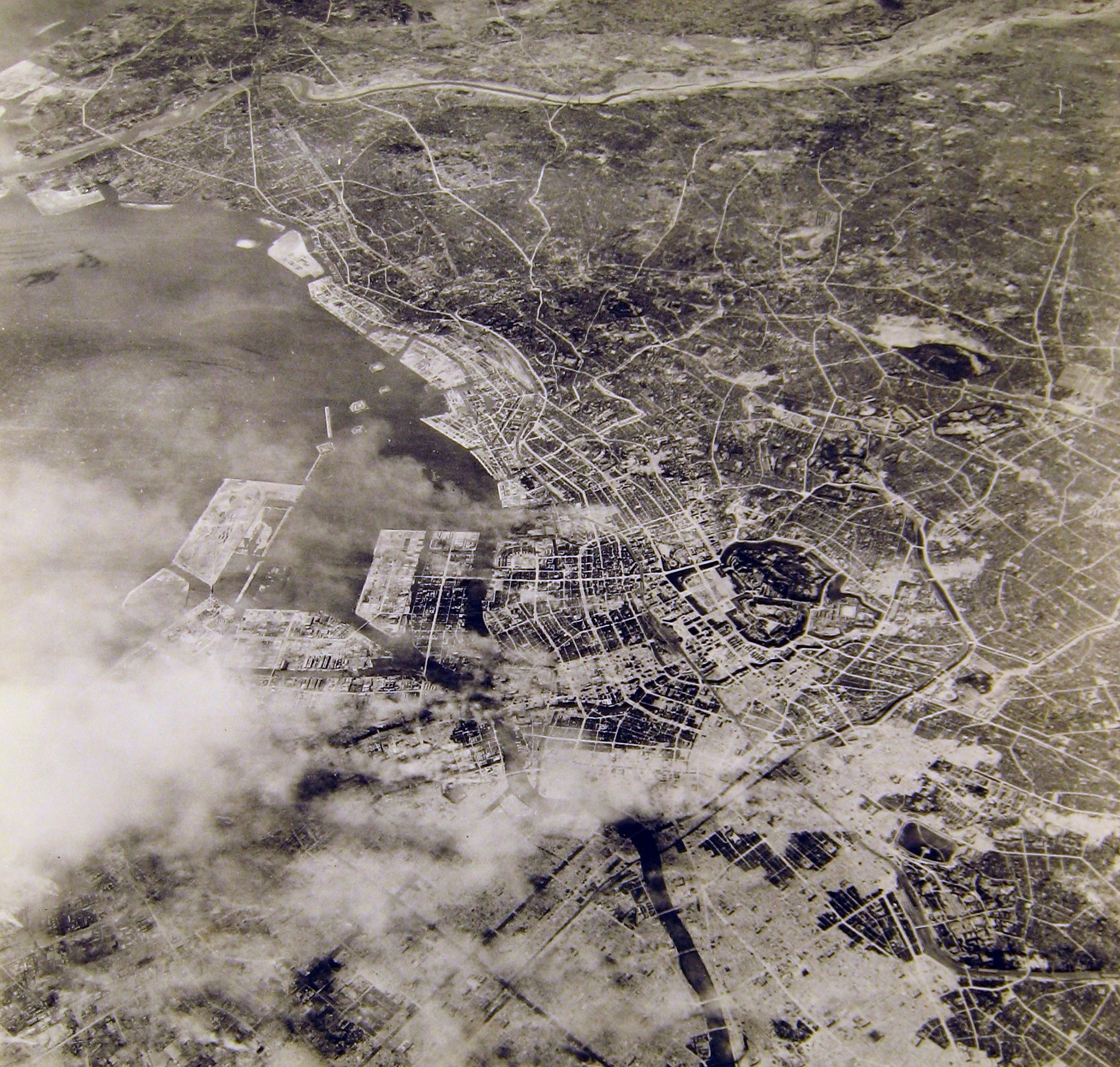
A USAAF reconnaissance photograph of Tokyo taken on 10 March 1945. Part of the area destroyed by the raid is visible at the bottom of the image.

The raid lasted for approximately two hours and forty minutes. Visibility over Tokyo decreased over the course of the raid due to the extensive smoke over the city. This led some American aircraft to bomb parts of Tokyo well outside the target area. The heat from the fires created heavy turbulence that affected the final waves of aircraft. Some American airmen also needed to use oxygen masks when the odor of burning flesh entered their aircraft. A total of 279 B-29s attacked Tokyo, dropping 1,665 short tons (1,510 t) of bombs. Another 19 Superfortresses which were unable to reach Tokyo struck targets of opportunity or of last resort. These aircraft turned back early due to mechanical problems or pilots deciding to abort the main mission because they were afraid of being killed.

Tokyo's defenders were expecting an attack, but did not detect the American force until it arrived over the city. The air defense units in the Kanto Plain area had been placed on alert, but the night fighter units were instructed not to sortie any aircraft until an incoming raid was detected. While picket boats spotted the attack force, poor radio reception meant that most of their reports were not received. Due to disorganization in the defense commands, little action was taken on the scattered reports which came in from the boats. At around midnight on 9 March a small number of B-29s were detected near Katsuura, but were thought to be conducting reconnaissance flights. Subsequent sightings of B-29s flying at low levels were not taken seriously, and the Japanese radar stations focused on searching for American aircraft operating at their usual high altitudes. The first alarm that a raid was in progress was issued at 12:15 am, just after the B-29s began dropping bombs on Tokyo. The 10th Air Division sortied all of its available night interceptors, and the 1st Anti-Aircraft Division's searchlight and anti-aircraft units went into action.

As expected by LeMay, the defense of Tokyo was not effective. Many American units encountered considerable anti-aircraft fire, but it was generally aimed at altitudes either above or below the bombers and reduced in intensity over time as gun positions were overwhelmed by fires. Nevertheless, the Japanese gunners shot down twelve B-29s, and damaged 42, of which two had to be written off. The Japanese fighters were ineffective; their pilots received no guidance from radar stations and the efforts of the anti-aircraft gunners and fighter units were not coordinated. No B-29s were shot down by fighters, and the American airmen reported only 76 sightings of Japanese fighters and 40 attacks by them over the course of the raid. Several Japanese pilots were killed when their aircraft ran out of fuel and crashed. Five of the B-29s shot down managed to ditch in the sea, and their crews were rescued by United States Navy submarines. American casualties were 96 airmen killed or missing, and six wounded or injured.

The B-29s arrived back at their bases in the Mariana Islands between 6:10 and 11:27 am local time on 10 March. Many of the bombers were streaked with ashes from the fires.

=== On the ground ===
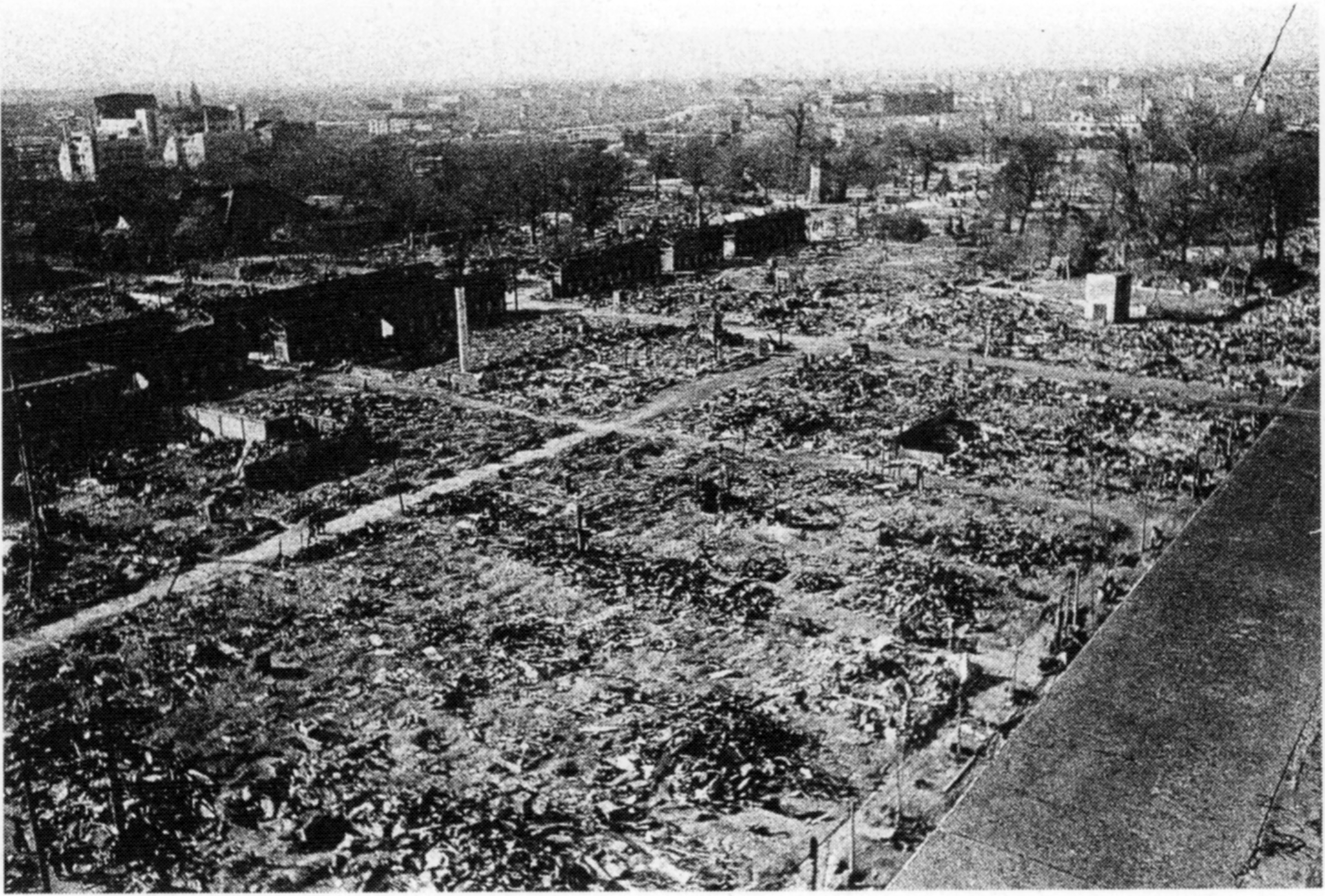
The ruins of Nakamise-dōri in Asakusa after the raid

Widespread fires rapidly developed across northeastern Tokyo. Within 30 minutes of the start of the raid the situation was beyond the fire department's control. An hour into the raid the fire department abandoned its efforts to fight the fires, instead guiding people to safety and rescuing those trapped in burning buildings. Over 125 firemen and 500 civil guards who had been assigned to help them were killed, and 96 fire engines destroyed.

Driven by the strong wind, the large numbers of small fires started by the American incendiaries rapidly merged into major blazes. These formed firestorms that quickly advanced to the north-west, destroying or damaging almost all the buildings in their path. The only buildings which survived the fire were constructed of stone. By an hour after the start of the attack most of eastern Tokyo either had been destroyed or was being affected by fires. The heat in some areas was reported to have reached a temperature of up to 1,800 °F (980 °C).

Civilians who stayed at their homes or attempted to fight the fire had virtually no chance of survival. Historian Richard B. Frank has written that "the key to survival was to grasp quickly that the situation was hopeless and flee". Soon after the start of the raid news broadcasts began advising civilians to evacuate as quickly as possible, but not all did so immediately. The foxholes which had been dug near most homes offered no protection against the firestorm, and civilians who sheltered in them were burned to death or suffocated.

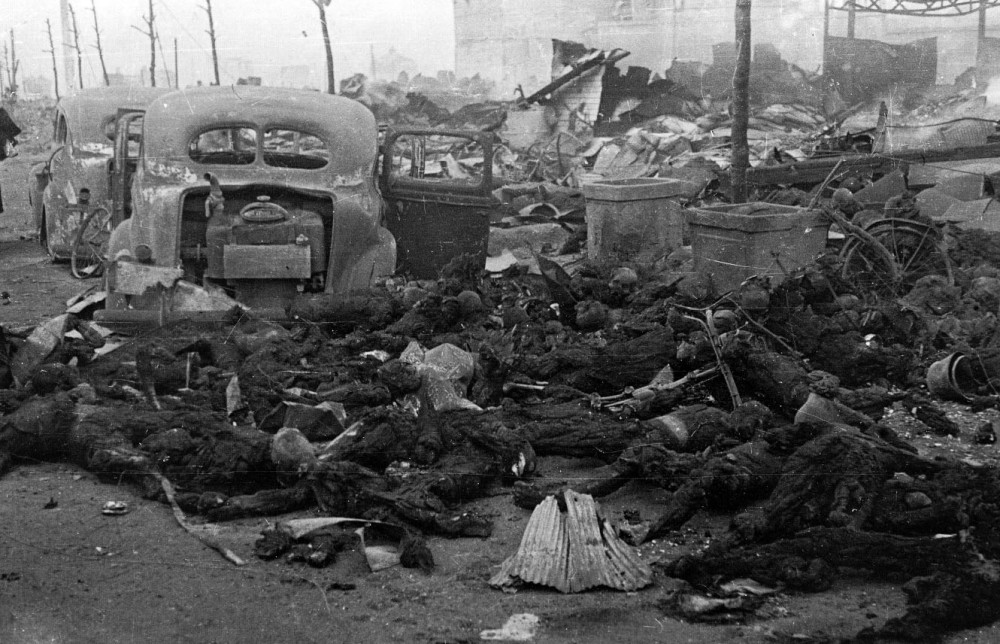
Charred remains of Japanese civilians after the raid

As the firestorm spread, civilians fled through the streets, desperate to escape the firestorm. Thousands of the evacuating civilians were killed by fire and by asphyxiation after the firestorm sucked oxygen out of the air. The heat was so intense that it caused people's clothes to burst into flames without actually having touched the fire. It also melted glass in windows, and the superheated air and cyclonic winds from the firestorm blew the hot liquefied glass to rain down and melt into people's skin. Families often sought to remain with their local neighborhood associations, but it was easy to become separated in the conditions; few families managed to stay together throughout the night. Escape frequently proved impossible, as smoke reduced visibility to just a few feet and roads were rapidly cut by the fires. Crowds of civilians often panicked as they rushed towards the perceived safety of canals, with those who fell being crushed to death. The majority of those killed in the raid died while trying to evacuate. In many cases entire families were killed. In a particularly deadly incident the full bomb load of a B-29 landed in a crowd of civilians crossing the Kototoi Bridge over the Sumida River, burning hundreds of people to death.

Few places in the targeted area provided safety. Many of those who attempted to evacuate to the large parks which had been created as refuges against fires following the 1923 Great Kantō earthquake were killed when the conflagration moved across these open spaces. Similarly, thousands of people who gathered in the grounds of the Sensō-ji temple in Asakusa died. Others sheltered in solid buildings, such as schools or theatres, and in canals. These were not proof against the firestorm; smoke inhalation and heat killed large numbers of people in schools. In one instance, over a thousand people were killed after they took refuge in a school's massive swimming pool and were boiled alive. Many of the people who attempted to shelter in canals were killed by smoke or when the passing firestorm sucked oxygen out of the air. However, these bodies of water provided safety to thousands of others. The fire finally burned itself out during mid-morning on 10 March, and came to a stop when it reached large open areas or the Nakagawa Canal. Thousands of people injured in the raid died over the following days.

After the raid, civilians across Tokyo offered assistance to the refugees. Firemen, police officers and soldiers tried to rescue survivors trapped under collapsed buildings. Many refugees who had previously lived in slums were accommodated in prosperous parts of the city. Some of these refugees resented the differences in living conditions, prompting riots and looting. Refugee centers were also established in parks and other open areas. Over a million people left the city in the following weeks, more than 90 percent of whom were accommodated in nearby prefectures. Due to the extent of the damage and the exodus from Tokyo, no attempt was made to restore services to large sections of the city.

== Aftermath ==
=== Casualties ===
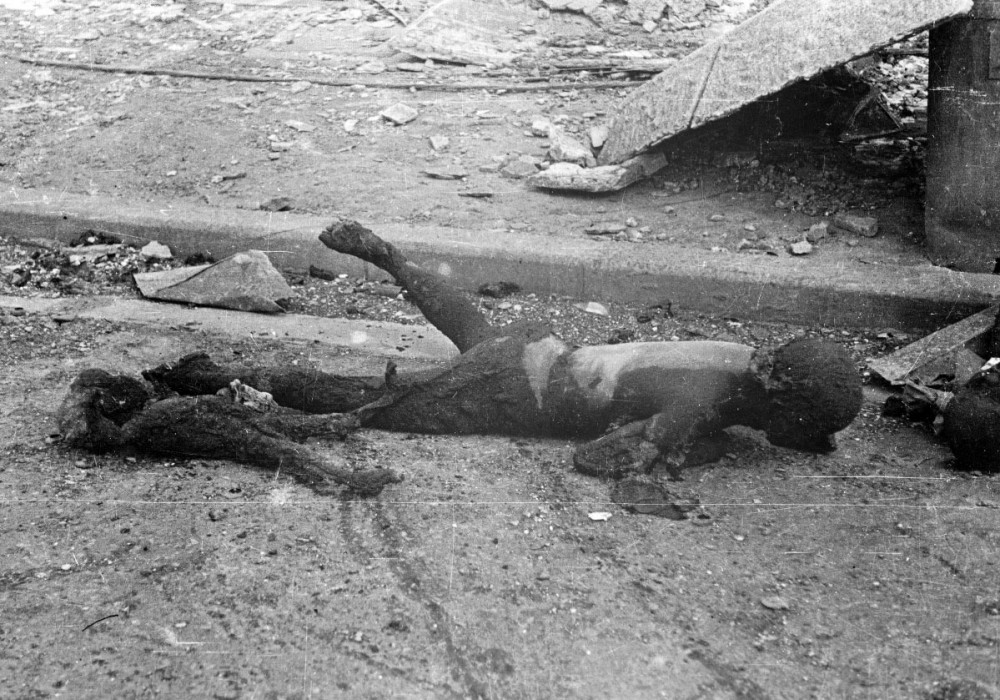
The charred body of a woman who was carrying a child on her back

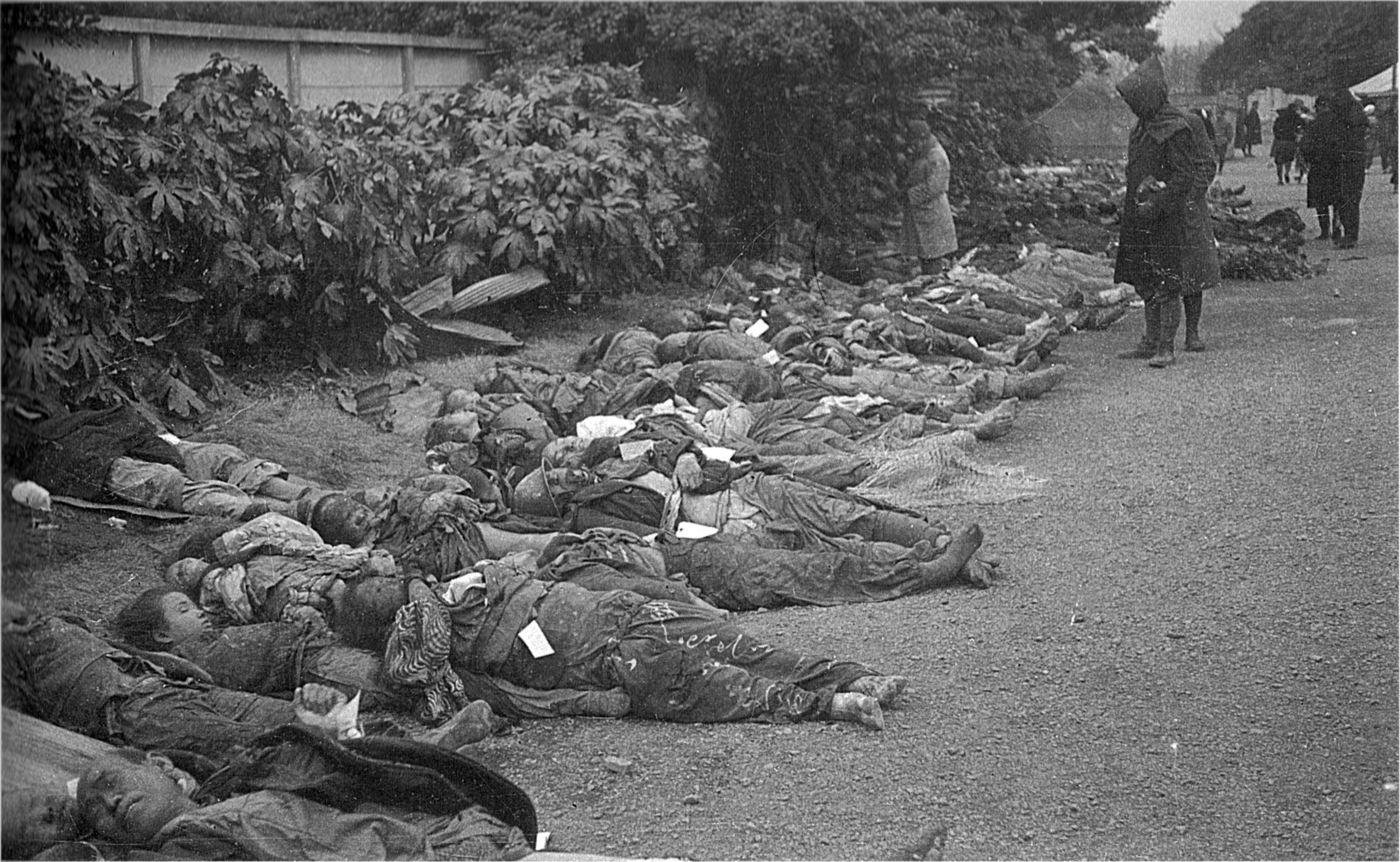
The bodies of victims laid out in Ueno Park

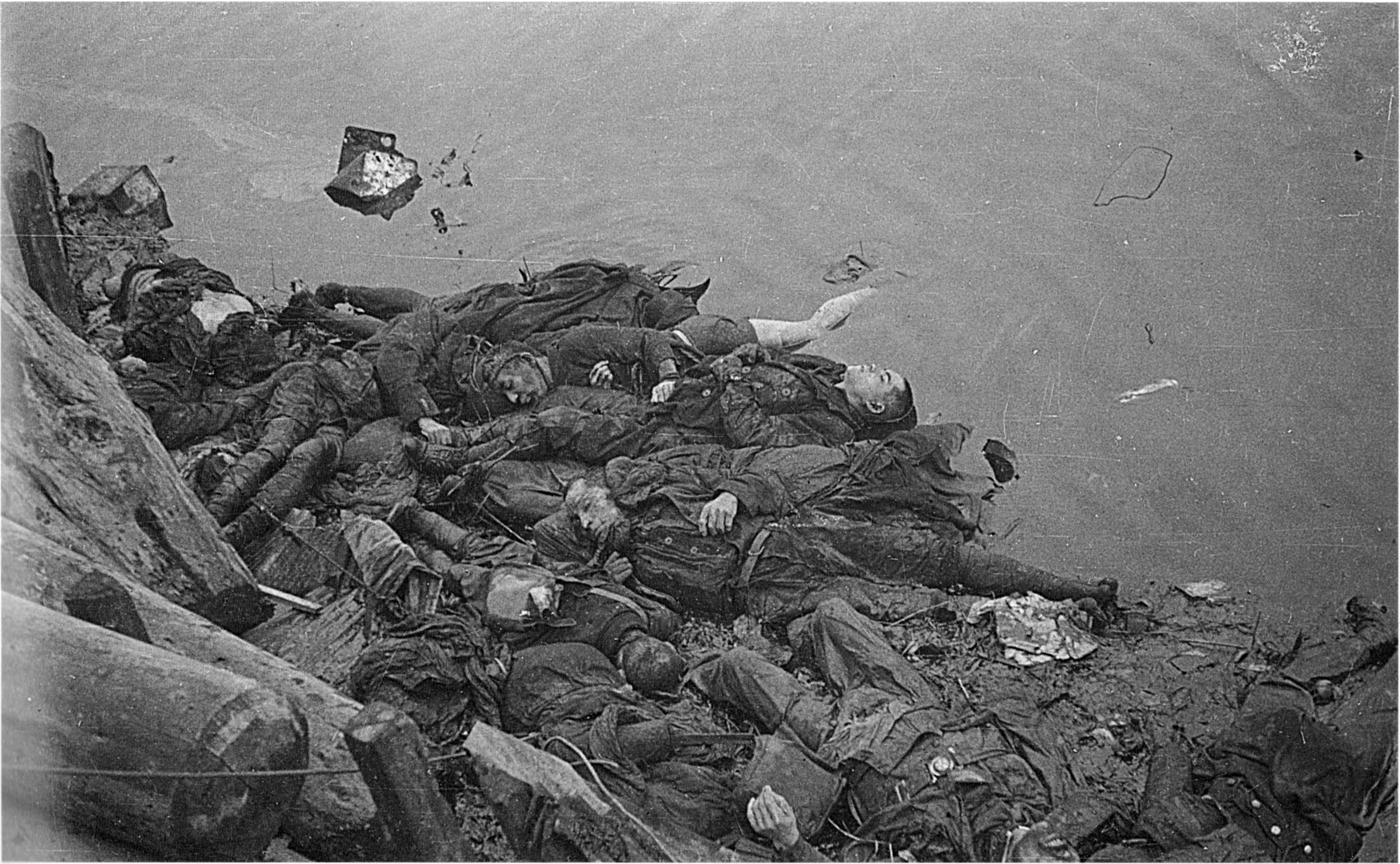
Bodies floating in the Oyoko River

Estimates of the number of people killed in the bombing of Tokyo on 10 March differ. After the raid, 79,466 bodies were recovered and recorded. Many other bodies were not recovered, and the city's director of health estimated that 83,600 people were killed and another 40,918 wounded. The Tokyo fire department put the casualties at 97,000 killed and 125,000 wounded, and the Tokyo Metropolitan Police Department believed that 124,711 people had been killed or wounded. After the war, the United States Strategic Bombing Survey estimated the casualties as 87,793 killed and 40,918 injured. The survey also stated that the majority of the casualties were women, children and elderly people.

Frank wrote in 1999 that historians generally believe that there were between 90,000 and 100,000 fatalities, but some argue that the number was much higher. For instance, Edwin P. Hoyt stated in 1987 that 200,000 people had been killed and in 2009 Mark Selden wrote that the number of deaths may have been several times the estimate of 100,000 used by the Japanese and United States Governments. As of 2011, the Tokyo Memorial Hall honored 105,400 people killed in the raid, the number of people whose ashes are interred in the building or were claimed by their family. As many bodies were not recovered, the number of fatalities is higher than this number. The large population movements out of and into Tokyo in the period before the raid, deaths of entire communities and destruction of records mean that it is not possible to know exactly how many died.

Most of the bodies which were recovered were buried in mass graves without being identified. Many bodies of people who had died while attempting to shelter in rivers were swept into the sea and never recovered. Attempts to collect bodies ceased 25 days after the raid.

The raid also caused widespread destruction. Police records show that 267,171 buildings were destroyed, a quarter of all buildings in Tokyo, making 1,008,005 survivors homeless. Most buildings in the Asakusa, Fukagawa, Honjo, Jōtō and Shitaya wards were destroyed, and seven other districts of the city lost around half their buildings. Parts of another 14 wards suffered damage. Overall, 15.8 square miles (41 km^{2}) of Tokyo was burned out. The number of people killed and area destroyed was the largest of any single air raid of the whole World War II, including the atomic bombings of Hiroshima and Nagasaki. The casualties and damage caused by the raid and absenteeism by workers in Tokyo considerably disrupted the Japanese war economy.

=== Reactions ===
LeMay and Arnold considered the operation to have been a significant success on the basis of reports made by the airmen involved and the extensive damage shown in photographs taken by reconnaissance aircraft on 10 March. Arnold sent LeMay a congratulatory message which stated that "this mission shows your crews have the guts for anything". The aircrew who conducted the attack were also pleased with its results. A post-strike assessment by XXI Bomber Command attributed the scale of damage to the firebombing being concentrated on a specific area, with the bombers attacking within a short timeframe, and the strong winds present over Tokyo.

Few concerns were raised in the United States during the war about the morality of the 10 March attack on Tokyo or the firebombing of other Japanese cities. These tactics were supported by the majority of decision-makers and American civilians. Historian Michael Howard has observed that these attitudes reflected the limited options to end the war which were available at the time. For instance, both Arnold and LeMay regarded the 10 March raid and subsequent firebombing operations as being necessary to save American lives by bringing the war to a rapid conclusion. President Franklin D. Roosevelt probably also held this view. While Secretary of War Henry L. Stimson was aware of LeMay's tactics and troubled by the lack of public reaction in the United States to the firebombing of Tokyo, he permitted these operations to continue until the end of the war.

The raid was followed by similar attacks against Nagoya on the night of 11/12 March, Osaka in the early hours of 14 March, Kobe on 17/18 March and Nagoya again on 18/19 March. An unsuccessful night precision raid was also conducted against an aircraft engine factory in Nagoya on 23/24 March. The firebombing attacks ended only because XXI Bomber Command's stocks of incendiaries were exhausted. The attacks on Tokyo, Nagoya, Osaka and Kobe during March burned out over 31 square miles (80 km^{2}) of the cities. The number of people killed in Nagoya, Osaka and Kobe were much lower than those in 10 March attack on Tokyo with fewer than 10,000 fatalities in each operation. The lower casualties were, in part, the result of better preparations by the Japanese authorities which had resulted from a realization that they had greatly under-estimated the threat posed by firebombing.

The Japanese government initially attempted to suppress news of the extent of the 10 March raid, but later used it for propaganda purposes. A communique issued by the Imperial Headquarters on 10 March stated that only "various places within the city were set afire". However, rumors of the devastation rapidly spread across the country. In a break from the usual practice of downplaying the damage caused by air attacks, the Japanese Government encouraged the media to emphasize the extensive scale of the destruction in an attempt to motivate anger against the United States. Stories about the attack were on the front page of all Japanese newspapers on 11 March. Reporting focused on the perceived immorality of the attack and the number of B-29s which had been destroyed. Subsequent newspaper reports made little reference to the scale of casualties, and the few photos which were published showed little physical damage. When the Japanese Government's official broadcaster Radio Tokyo reported the attack it was labeled "slaughter bombing". Other radio broadcasts focused on B-29 losses and the claimed desire of Japanese civilians to continue the war. American newspaper reports focused on the physical damage to Tokyo, made little reference to casualties and did not include estimates of the death toll. This resulted from the content of USAAF communiques and reports rather than censorship.

The attack considerably damaged the morale of Japanese civilians, with it and the other firebombing raids in March convincing most that the war situation was worse than their government had admitted. The Japanese Government responded with a combination of repression, including heavy penalties for people accused of disloyalty or spreading rumors, and a propaganda campaign focused on restoring confidence in the country's air and civil defense measures. These measures were generally unsuccessful.

Few steps were taken to improve Tokyo's defenses after the raid. The majority of the 10th Air Division's senior officers were sacked or reassigned as punishment for the unit's failure on 10 March. Only 20 aircraft were sent to Tokyo to reinforce the 10th Air Division, and these were transferred elsewhere two weeks later when no further attacks were made against the capital. From April, the Japanese reduced their attempts to intercept Allied air raids to preserve aircraft to contest the expected invasion of Japan. The 1st Anti-Aircraft Division remained active until the end of the war in August 1945. The Japanese military never developed adequate defenses against night air raids, with the night fighter force remaining ineffective and many cities not being protected by anti-aircraft guns.

Between April and mid-May XXI Bomber Command mainly focused on attacking airfields in southern Japan in support of the invasion of Okinawa. From 11 May until the end of the war the B-29s conducted day precision bombing attacks when weather conditions were favorable, and night firebombing raids against cities at all other times. Further incendiary attacks were conducted against Tokyo, with the final taking place on the night of 25/26 May. By this time, 50.8 percent of the city had been destroyed and more than 4 million people left homeless. Further heavy bomber raids against Tokyo were judged to not be worthwhile, and it was removed from XXI Bomber Command's target list. By the end of the war, 75 percent of the sorties conducted by XXI Bomber Command had been part of firebombing operations.

== Remembrance ==
The Dwelling of Remembrance memorial in Yokoamicho Park

Following the war the bodies which had been buried in mass graves were exhumed and cremated. The ashes were interred in a charnel house located in Sumida's Yokoamicho Park which had originally been established to hold the remains of 58,000 victims of the 1923 earthquake. A Buddhist service has been conducted to mark the anniversary of the raid on 10 March each year since 1951. A number of small neighborhood memorials were also established across the affected area in the years after the raid. 10 March was designated Tokyo Peace Day by the Tokyo Metropolitan Assembly in 1990.

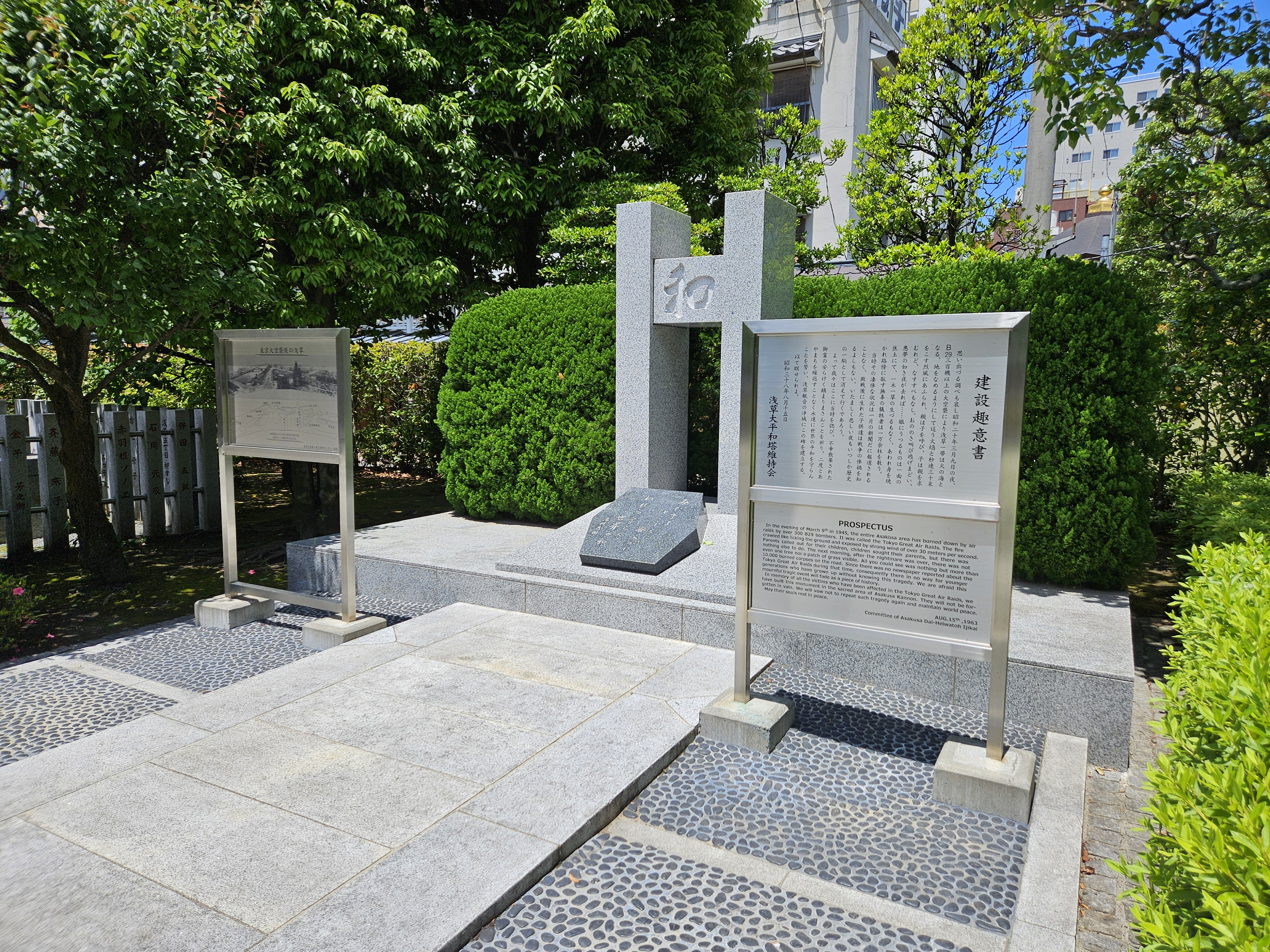
In 1963, a monument to the March 9 Tokyo Air Raids was placed near the Sensō Ji Temple in the Asakusa neighborhood of Tokyo

Few other memorials were erected to commemorate the attack in the decades after the war. Efforts began in the 1970s to construct an official Tokyo Peace Museum to mark the raid, but the Tokyo Metropolitan Assembly canceled the project in 1999. Instead, the Dwelling of Remembrance memorial to civilians killed in the raid was built in Yokoamicho Park. This memorial was dedicated in March 2001. A group of citizens led by the writer Katsumoto Saotome who had been most active in campaigning for the Tokyo Peace Museum established the privately funded Center of the Tokyo Raids and War Damage, which opened in 2002. As of 2015, this center was the main repository of information in Japan about the firebombing raids. A small section of the Edo-Tokyo Museum also covers the air raids on Tokyo.

=== Historiography ===
Many historians have stated that the 10 March raid on Tokyo was a military success for the United States, and marked the start of the most effective period of air raids on Japan. For instance, the USAAF official history judged that the attack fully met LeMay's objectives, and it and the subsequent firebombing raids shortened the war. More recently, Tami Davis Biddle noted in The Cambridge History of the Second World War that "the Tokyo raid marked a dramatic turn in the American air campaign in the Far East; following on the heels of many months of frustration, it loosed the full weight of American industrial might on the faltering Japanese". Mark Lardas has written that 10 March operation was only the second genuinely successful raid on Japan (after an attack against an aircraft factory on 19 January), and "LeMay's decision to switch from precision bombardment to area incendiary missions and to conduct the incendiary missions from low altitudes" was the most important factor in the eventual success of the strategic bombing campaign.

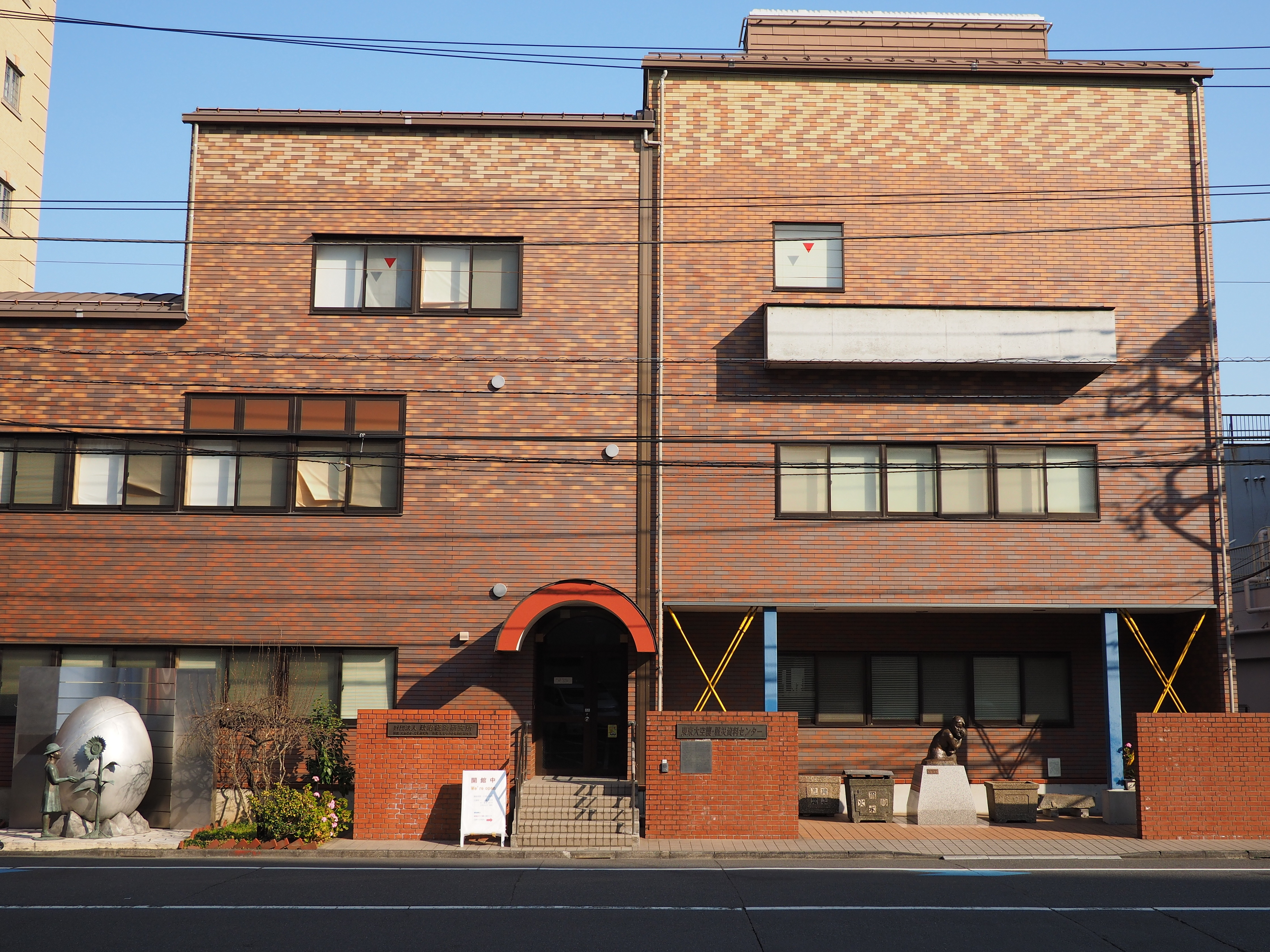
The Center of the Tokyo Raids and War Damage

Historians have also discussed the significance of the raid in the USAAF's transition from an emphasis on precision bombing to area bombing. Conrad C. Crane has observed that "the resort to fire raids marked another stage in the escalation towards total war and represented the culmination of trends begun in the air war against Germany". Kenneth P. Werrell noted that the firebombing of Japanese cities and the atomic bomb attacks "have come to epitomize the strategic bombing campaign against Japan. All else, some say, is a prelude or tangential". Historians such as Biddle, William W. Ralph and Barrett Tillman have argued that the decision to change to firebombing tactics was motivated by Arnold and LeMay's desire to prove that the B-29s were effective, and that a strategic bombing force could be a war-winning military arm. British historian Max Hastings shares this view, and has written that the circumstances in which XXI Bomber Command shifted to area attacks in 1945 mirrored those which led Bomber Command to do the same from 1942.

Like the bombing of Dresden, the bombing of Tokyo on 10 March 1945 is used as an example by historians and commentators who criticize the ethics and practices of the Allied strategic bombing campaigns. Concerns initially raised regarding these two raids in the years after the war have over time evolved into widely-held doubts over the morality and effectiveness of the campaigns. For instance, Selden argues that the attack on Tokyo marked the beginning of an American "approach to warfare that targets entire populations for annihilation". As part of his general critique of Allied area bombing raids on German and Japanese cities, the philosopher A. C. Grayling judged that the 10 March raid was "unnecessary and disproportionate". Some commentators believe that racism motivated the decision to use firebombing tactics, in contrast to the USAAF's greater emphasis on precision bombing in its air campaign against Germany. Werrell has written that while racism may have influenced this, "many other factors were involved, which, I would submit, were more significant". Frank has reached similar conclusions. He also argues that the USAAF would have used firebombing tactics in Europe had German cities been as vulnerable to fire as Japanese cities were and intelligence on the German war economy been as lacking as it was on the Japanese war production facilities. Tillman has written that area bombing was the only viable tactic available to the USAAF at the time given the failure of the precision bombing campaign.

After the bombing, Emperor Hirohito toured the destroyed areas on 18 March. Historians' views of the effects of this experience on him differ. F.J. Bradley states that the visit convinced Hirohito that Japan had lost the war. Tillman has written that the raid had no effect on the Emperor, and Frank said that Hirohito supported continuing the war until mid-1945. Japan did not surrender until mid-August 1945, a few days after the atom-bombing of Hiroshima and Nagasaki.

=== Today ===
The academic Cary Karacas has said that a reason for the low-profile official commemoration of the attack in Japan is that the government does not want to acknowledge "that it was Japan who initiated the first-ever air raids on Asia's cities". Karacas argues that the Japanese government prefers to focus on the atomic bombing of Hiroshima and Nagasaki as commemoration of these attacks "reinforces the Japanese-as-victim stereotype".

In 2007, a group of survivors of the 10 March raid and bereaved families launched a lawsuit seeking compensation and an apology for the Japanese government's actions regarding the attack. As part of the case, it was argued that the raid had been a war crime and that the Japanese government had acted wrongly by agreeing to elements of the 1951 Treaty of San Francisco that waived the right to seek compensation for such actions from the American government. The plaintiffs also claimed that the Japanese government had violated the postwar constitution by compensating the military victims of the raid and their families, but not civilians. The government argued that it was not obliged to compensate the victims of air raids. In 2009, the Tokyo District Court ruled in favor of the government. From 2009 to 2015, a public campaign advocated for the Japanese government to pass legislation to provide compensation to civilian survivors of the raid, leading to the formation of a nonpartisan group of Diet members in 2015 dedicated to the task. However, the group failed to reach a consensus, and no legislation was submitted to the Diet. This was the last major political action related to compensation for the attack.
