= Charles Fritz =

American disaster research scientist

Charles E. Fritz (1921 – 5 May 2000) was an American scientist pioneering disaster research during and following the Second World War.

Fritz was born in Missouri and graduated from Drury University with a good degree in sociology. He then attended the University of Chicago gaining a master's degree. He then joined the Army Air Forces.

== Career ==
=== Participant observer, England 1943 - 1946 ===
During the Second World War Fritz was a captain in the United States Army Air Forces. Between 1943 and 1946 he was stationed in seven different locations in England. Whilst in Bath, where his courtship of his wife enabled a more intimate experience of English social relations, he witnessed a remarkable resilience in the face of the danger and deprivations of war and the arrival of 6 million - 8 million American and allied troops.

=== Staff member US Strategic Bombing Survey 1945 - 1946 ===
In 1945 he was stationed to Teddington as part of the United States Strategic Bombing Survey (USSBS) where his role was to produce 70 volumes involved in the study of the impact of the US strategic bombing of Germany in terms of its economic, demographic, industrial, morale, organizational and physical effects.

=== Associate Director at National Opinion Research Center 1950 - 1954 ===
Fritz joined the National Opinion Research Center as associate director of the Disaster Project. This project organised a 25 string team of trained interviewers that could be quickly deployed to disaster-struck areas to conduct interviews with both the victims of a disaster and staff from organisations responding to the disaster. These interviewers were recruited primarily from social science students who had graduated from the University of Chicago.

== Works ==
- (1958) Disaster research and military interrogation (Special report of the Bureau of Social Science Research)
- (1961/1996) Disasters and Mental Health: Therapeutic Principles Drawn From Disaster Studies University of Delaware Disaster Research Center

== Family life ==
In 1945 Fritz married Patricia Ware who he met while stationed in Bath in the 1940s. They had two children, Jonathan and Sherily.
