= John Beuerlein =

American academic and philanthropist

19th president of Drury University
- In office March 23, 2023 – May 31, 2024
- Preceded by: J. Timothy Cloyd
- Succeeded by: Jeff Frederick

Personal details
- Born: 1953 (age 72–73)
- Spouse: Crystal Beuerlein
- Children: 3
- Education: Drury University; Washington University in St. Louis

John Beuerlein is a retired financial analyst and philanthropist. Beuerlein spent much of his career at Edward Jones Investments, becoming the youngest person in the firm's history to be promoted to general partner at the age of 26. In 2023, Beuerlein was selected by the Drury University Board of Trustees to serve as the institution's interim president following the departure of previous president Timothy Cloyd.

== Early life and education ==
Beuerlein was born in Rolla, Missouri in 1953. One year later, the Beuerlein family moved to Springfield, Missouri, where John attended Saint Agnes Catholic School. He graduated from Subiaco Academy, a private male-only boarding school located in Subiaco, Arkansas in 1971. Returning to his hometown of Springfield, he attended Drury University where he met his wife Crystal and earned a bachelor's degree in business administration in 1975. He continued his studies at Washington University in St. Louis, earning a Master of Business Administration from the Olin Business School in 1977. In 1981, he earned the Chartered Financial Analyst certification.

== Career ==
While earning his MBA at Washington University in St. Louis, Beuerlein held an internship at Edward Jones Investments. Shortly before graduating, he was offered a full-time position in the company's Investment Banking division. He was promoted to general partner in 1980 at the age of 26, becoming the youngest person in the firm's history to hold this position. During his career, Beuerlein served on the board of governors of the St. Louis Society of Financial Analysts.

== Philanthropy ==
Beuerlein served on the Drury University board of trustees from 1991 to 2011, where he was chairman of the board from 2006 to 2010. During his time on the board, he co-chaired and provided the initial gift to establish a Campaign for Science, resulting in the construction of a new science building called the Trustee Science Center. He also donated $2 million to establish the Edward Jones Center for Entrepreneurship and Innovation at the institution. In 2011, he was elected Emeritus Trustee. He was elected to be the university's first Life Trustee in 2016. In March 2023, he was selected by the board to serve as interim president of the institution. This followed the resignation of predecessor Timothy Cloyd due to family health concerns. During his presidency, Beuerlein donated an additional $1.5 million the university's Fortify the Future campaign. After fourteen months as interim president, he was succeeded by Jeff Frederick.

John and his wife Crystal are members of the Zenith Society of the Alzheimer's Association. Beuerlein also serves as co-chair of the association's Step Up the Pace initiative, which has raised over $109 million to date for Alzheimer's research.
