= Gian Gentile =

United States Army colonel

Gian P. Gentile
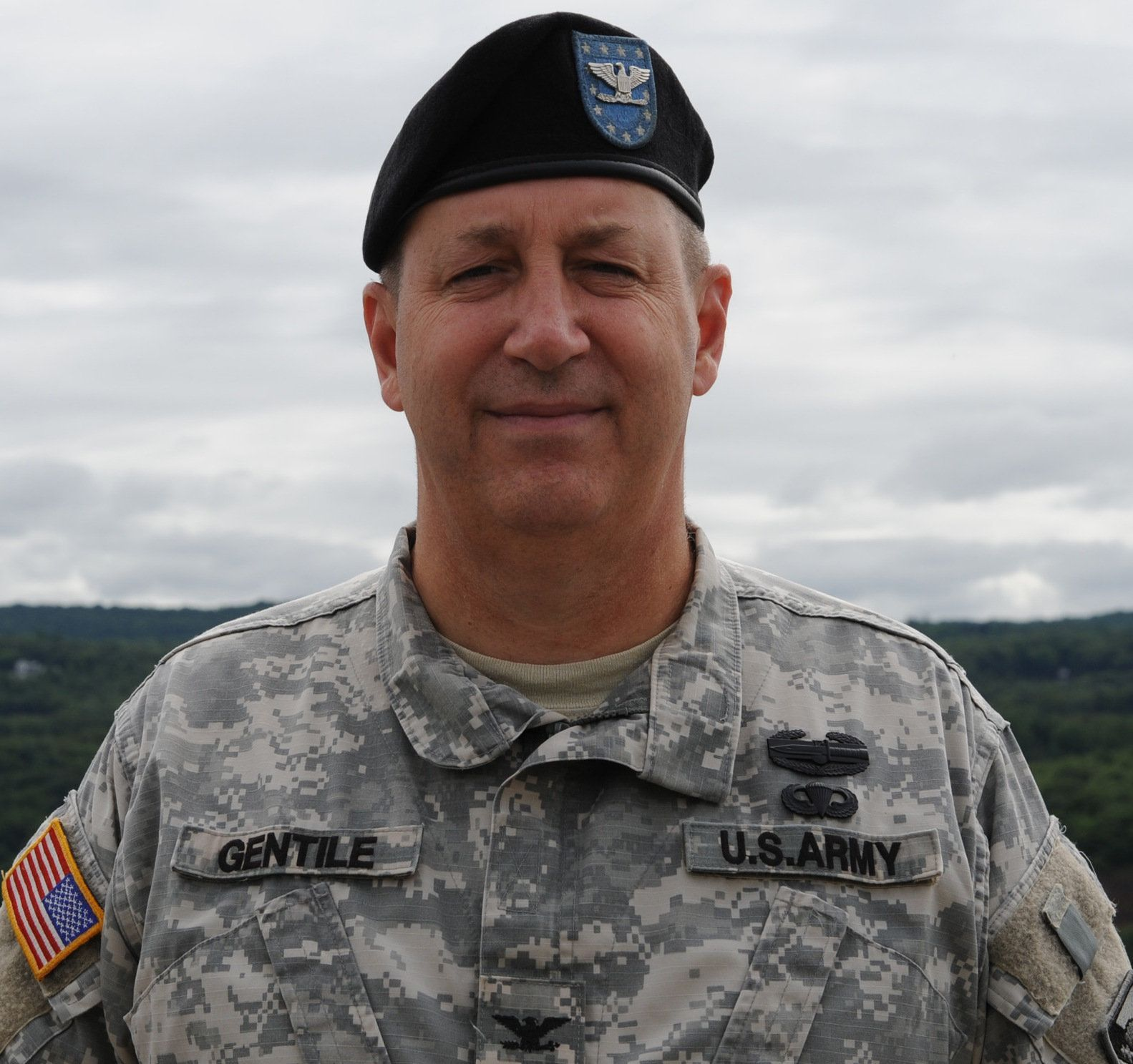
- Born: October 9, 1957 (age 68)
- Education: Ph.D., History, Stanford University, 2000
- Occupations: US Army officer, history professor at West Point
- Known for: Critique of US Army counter-insurgency doctrine

Gian P. Gentile (born October 9, 1957) is a retired US Army colonel, who served for many years as a history professor at the United States Military Academy at West Point. Gentile has also been a visiting fellow at the Council on Foreign Relations and a senior historian at the RAND Corporation. He is a leading critic of U.S. military counter-insurgency doctrine.

== Biography ==
Gentile enlisted in the US Army in 1975 and graduated from UC-Berkeley's ROTC program in 1986. He completed a PhD in history at Stanford University in 2000. He served two tours in Iraq, first as the executive officer of a combat brigade in Tikrit in 2003 and then as a squadron commander in western Baghdad in 2006.

== Books ==
Gentile's post-graduate academic work was on the topic of military air power. How Effective is Strategic Bombing?, published in 2001, challenged the conclusions of the Strategic Bombing Survey. Reflecting on Gentile's work, the book review editor for The Journal of Conflict Studies wrote that “strategic bombing seems to have adapted itself nicely to the exigencies of democratic government; providing a way of waging limited war at arm's length, minimizing casualties on both sides of the conflict, and satisfying both domestic population and politician.” But that “it is left to Gian Gentile ... to pose the question US policy-makers should be asking: How effective is strategic bombing?” The reviewer opined that “Gentile's answers are fresh because he ... show[s] the reader that the question has rarely been answered honestly or even, in some cases, competently.” He also echoed Gentile's central point that “the US Air Force among others has frequently, and sometimes purposely, failed to distinguish between the effects of strategic bombing and its effectiveness,” emphasizing that the “effects, physically observed and measured, are relatively easy to see and to report--and impress the public with.” However, “the effectiveness of same is wide open for debate.”

Gentile's second book, Wrong Turn: America's Deadly Embrace of Counterinsurgency, appeared in July 2013. Andrew Rosenbaum, in the New York Journal of Books, said: "Col. Gentile very capably shows that counterinsurgency, which can be roughly summed up as a 'nation-building' strategy, didn’t work in the past, when the British tried it in Malaysia, nor when the U.S. tried it in Vietnam, and that it certainly did not work in Iraq and Afghanistan, despite the hype it received when it was tried. A separate chapter is dedicated to each of these efforts, and Col. Gentile goes into sufficient detail to make a very good case. Col. Gentile then shows that the strategy is fundamentally flawed, and cannot work in the form that it has been proposed."

== Criticism of U.S. counter-insurgency strategy ==
Gentile is a prominent critic of the U.S. military's use of counter-insurgency. He believes that the 2007 surge was not the primary cause of the reduction in violence in Iraq and that effective counter-insurgency tactics were practiced by American troops in Iraq starting in 2004, rather than being introduced in 2007. Instead, Gentile argues that paying Sunni insurgents to help coalition forces eradicate al-Qaeda in Iraq and Muqtada al-Sadr's decision to call a cease fire in southern Iraq were the main causal factors. He further argues that the U.S. military is now concentrating excessively on counter-insurgency, to the detriment of its capacity to fight conventional wars. Following Andrew Bacevich, Gentile believes that the prominence of counterinsurgency has led to an unrealistic view of the American military's power and capacity to change the world.

== Publications ==
- Advocacy or Assessment?: The United States Strategic Bombing Survey of Germany and Japan. Palo Alto: Stanford University. 1998.
- Severing the Snake's Head: The Question of Air Power as a Political Instrument in the Post-Cold War Security Environment: A Monograph. Fort Leavenworth: School of Advanced Military Studies, U.S. Army Command and General Staff College. 2000.
- How Effective is Strategic Bombing?: Lessons Learned from World War II to Kosovo. New York: New York University Press. 2001. ISBN 9780814731352.
- "Misreading the Surge Threatens U.S. Army's Conventional Capabilities". World Politics Review. March 4, 2008.
- "A (Slightly) Better War: A Narrative and Its Defects". World Affairs (Summer 2008). Archived from the original on September 15, 2012.
- Gentile, Gian P. (Autumn 2009). "A Strategy of Tactics: Population-centric COIN and the Army". The US Army War College Quarterly: Parameters. 39 (3): 5–17. doi:10.55540/0031-1723.2485. S2CID 247346952. Archived from the original on April 8, 2013.
- "Time for the Deconstruction of Field Manual 3-24" (PDF). Joint Forces Quarterly (58). National Defense University Press: 116–117. 2010.
- Wrong Turn: America's Deadly Embrace of Counterinsurgency. New York: The New Press. 2013. ISBN 9781595588746.
