= 1st Anti-Aircraft Division (Japan) =

- Active: December 1944 – August 1945
- Country: (Empire of Japan) Japan
- Role: Air defence
- Size: Division
- Part of: Eastern District Army
- Engagements: World War II: Air raids on Japan

The 1st Anti-Aircraft Division was an Imperial Japanese Army unit of World War II. It was responsible for the anti-aircraft guns and searchlight units assigned to defend cities in the central region of Honshu.

== History ==
At the start of the Pacific War, the Eastern District Army included the Eastern Anti-Aircraft Brigade, which was one of two such units in the Imperial Japanese Army responsible for homeland air defence. It was equipped with around 150 anti-aircraft guns, most of which were obsolete, and its personnel were poorly trained. As a result of the Doolittle Raid in April 1942, on 19 November that year a major reorganisation of the Army's homeland air defence units took place. This reform saw the Eastern Anti-Aircraft Brigade replaced by the Eastern Air Defence Headquarters. The size of this force was expanded from April 1944 as part of a broader expansion of the homeland air defence units. However, these units were affected by shortages of anti-aircraft guns. By June 1944 the Eastern Air Defence Headquarters controlled 300 anti-aircraft guns.

In December 1944 the 1st Anti-Aircraft Division was established to command the Eastern District Army's air defence units. Three other anti-aircraft divisions were also established at this time. The 1st Anti-Aircraft Division was much larger than the other such divisions, and comprised eight anti-aircraft regiments, six independent anti-aircraft battalions, four machine cannon companies and a regiment equipped with searchlights.

The 1st Anti-Aircraft Division saw extensive combat while trying to contest the Allied air raids on Japan. This included protecting Tokyo from attack, during which it was involved in the devastating raid against the city on the night of 9/10 March 1945. By the end of the war in August 1945, the division claimed to have shot down 193 Boeing B-29 Superfortress heavy bombers and damaged 454. These claims considerably over-stated the division's actual achievements, as like the other anti-aircraft divisions its performance was greatly limited by shortages of equipment.

== Structure ==
Upon formation in December 1944, the 1st Anti-Aircraft Division comprised the following units:

- 111th Anti-Aircraft Regiment
- 112th Anti-Aircraft Regiment
- 113th Anti-Aircraft Regiment
- 114th Anti-Aircraft Regiment
- 115th Anti-Aircraft Regiment
- 116th Anti-Aircraft Regiment
- 117th Anti-Aircraft Regiment
- 118th Anti-Aircraft Regiment
- 1st Independent Anti-Aircraft Battalion
- 2nd Independent Anti-Aircraft Battalion
- 3rd Independent Anti-Aircraft Battalion
- 4th Independent Anti-Aircraft Battalion
- 95th Field Anti-Aircraft Battalion
- 96th Field Anti-Aircraft Battalion
- 1st Machine Cannon Battalion
- 4th Machine Cannon Battalion
- 1st Searchlight Regiment
