= Cloyd (surname) =

Cloyd is a surname. It is carried by some descendants of the Scottish MacLeod Clan.

Notable people with the surname include:

- David Cloyd (born 1974), American singer-songwriter
- K. J. Cloyd (born 2001), American football player
- Paul Cloyd (1920–2005), American basketball player
- Timothy Cloyd, American educator and university administrator
- Tyler Cloyd (born 1987), American baseball player

Fictional

- Denis Cloyd, a character in The Walking Dead.
- Dennis Cloyd, a mentioned character in The Walking Dead.

== Sources ==
- Black, George (1943). The Surnames of Scotland: Their Origin, Meaning, and History. Retrieved 15 August 2024.
- Scots Kith and Kin. (1960). Edinburgh: Collins. Retrieved 15 August 2024.
