= Timothy Cloyd =

American educator and administrator

J. Timothy Cloyd
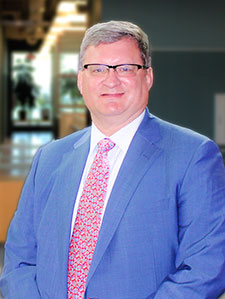

18th president of Drury University
- In office July 1, 2016 – March 23, 2023
- Preceded by: David Manuel
- Succeeded by: John Beuerlein

Personal details
- Spouse: Wendy Cloyd
- Children: 3
- Education: Emory and Henry College; University of Massachusetts, Amherst
- Website: Office of the President

J. Timothy Cloyd is an American educator and former higher education administrator. Cloyd served as the president of Hendrix College in Conway, Arkansas from 2001 to 2013. In 2016, he became president of Drury University in Springfield, Missouri, a position he held until his resignation in March 2023.

== Career ==
Cloyd began his academic career in 1990 as an assistant professor of political science at Vanderbilt University in Nashville, Tennessee. In 1994, Cloyd took a faculty position in the department of political science at the University of Arkansas - Little Rock, where he remained until 1997. That year, he accepted a position as the vice president for institutional advancement at Hendrix College before assuming the position of president of the college in 2001.

Under Cloyd's presidency, Hendrix saw the construction of thirteen new buildings, including a $28 million student life and technology center, a $17 million wellness center, three art buildings, and an athletic stadium. The college also experienced enrollment growth, increasing more than 52% from 950 to 1,495 students.

In 2013, Cloyd stepped down as president and remained on the faculty at Hendrix as a professor of politics and international relations until 2016. On July 1, 2016, Cloyd began his tenure as the president of Drury University. On March 23, 2023, he stepped down as President due to family health concerns.

== Academic background ==
Cloyd earned a Bachelor of Arts in philosophy from Emory and Henry College in Emory, Virginia in 1985. He completed a Master of Arts and a Ph.D. in political science from the University of Massachusetts Amherst.

== Research and publications ==
Cloyd is the co-editor of Politics and the Human Body: Assault on Dignity, a collection of essays focusing on bioethical issues, including death and dying, reproductive ethics, human genome, and organ transplantation. The book was published in 1995 by the Vanderbilt University Press.
