= John Sellars (academic administrator) =

American retired university president

17th President of Graceland University
- In office May 2007 – July 2017
- Succeeded by: Patricia Draves

15th President of Drury University
- In office 2005–2007

Personal details
- Born: Independence, Missouri, U.S.
- Education: University of Central Missouri (B.A.); University of Missouri–Kansas City (MPA, Ph.D.)

John Sellars, is a retired American academic administrator. He was named president of Graceland University in May 2007, serving until 2017. He previously served as the fifteenth president of Drury University for two years, and a senior vice president for institutional advancement at Syracuse University.

== Biography ==
Sellars was born and raised in Independence, Missouri and received his bachelor's degree from University of Central Missouri. He continued his education at the University of Missouri–Kansas City, where he received a master's degree in public administration in 1986 and a Ph.D. in 1992. His post-graduate studies include the Institute for Educational Management at Harvard University and the Strategic Planning and Higher Education Marketing program at the Wharton School of the University of Pennsylvania.

In 2005, Sellars became the 15th president of Drury University, though his tenure ended abruptly after he announced the school was millions of dollars in debt, initiated a re-examination of the university's mission, and appeared to squelch academic freedom following a controversial interview by a faculty member. On April 23, 2007, facing a likely vote of no confidence from the faculty, Sellars resigned.

One month later, on May 24, 2007, Sellars was named president of Graceland University in Lamoni, Iowa, effective July 15. In 2016, the university announced that Sellars would retire in July, 2017. He was succeeded by Patricia Draves, who formerly served as vice president for academic affairs and dean of the University of Mount Union in Alliance, Ohio.
