= United States Strategic Bombing Survey =

Report on the effects of Allied strategic bombing during World War II

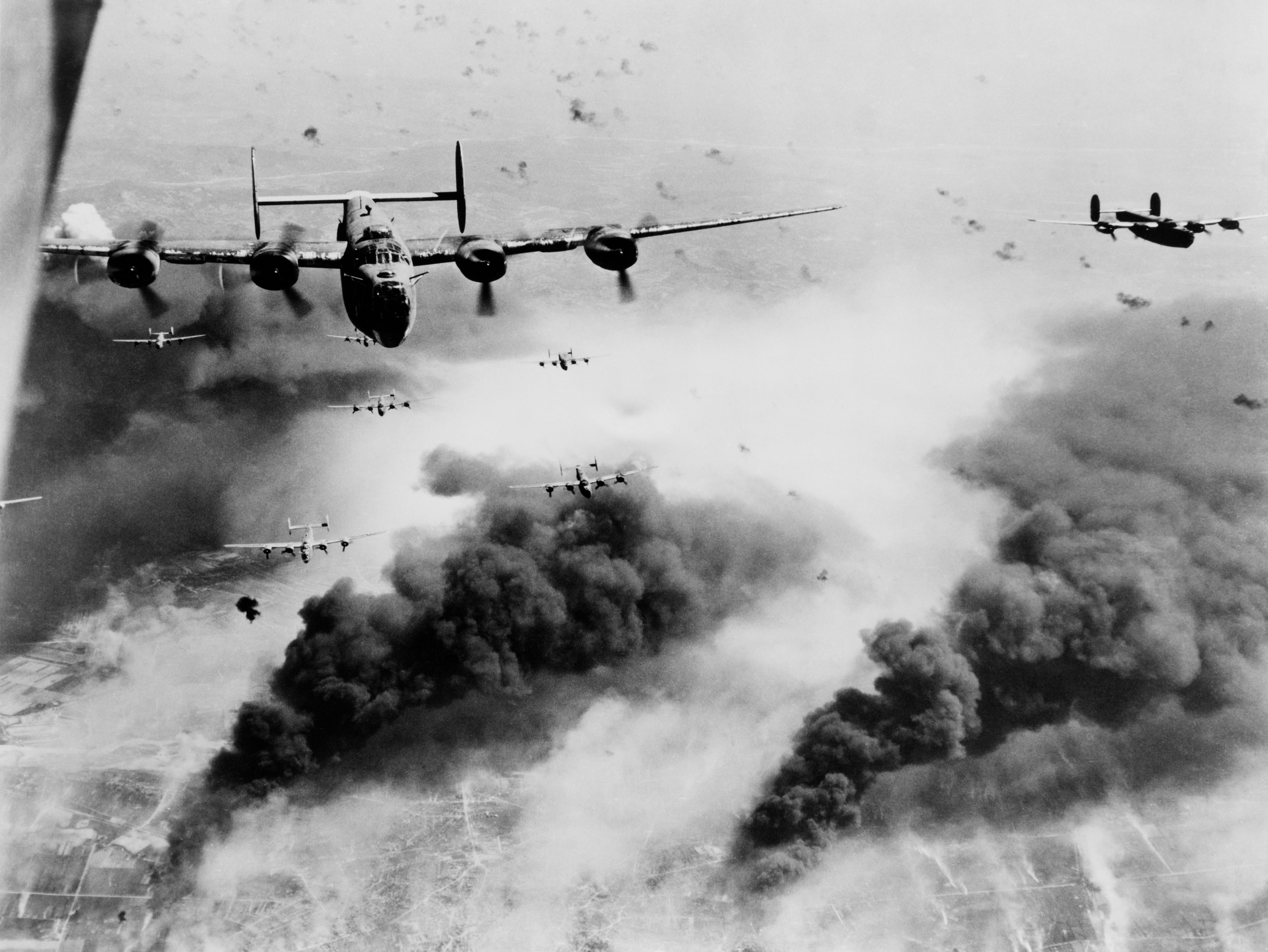
American Consolidated B-24 Liberator bombers attacking a Romanian oil refinery, May 1944

The United States Strategic Bombing Survey (USSBS) was a written report created by a board of experts assembled to produce an impartial assessment of the effects of the Anglo-American strategic bombing of Nazi Germany during the European theatre of World War II. After publishing the report in 1945, the Survey members then turned their attention to the war efforts against Imperial Japan during the Pacific War, including a separate section on the recent use of the atomic bomb in attacks on two Japanese cities.

In total, the reports contained 208 volumes for Europe and another 108 for the Pacific, comprising thousands of pages. The reports' conclusions were generally favorable about the contributions of Allied strategic bombing towards victory.

The survey said of Allied airpower that it "was decisive in the war in Western Europe. Hindsight inevitably suggests that it might have been employed differently or better in some respects. Nevertheless, it was decisive. In the air, its victory was complete. At sea, its contribution, combined with naval power, brought an end to the enemy's greatest naval threat-the U-boat; on land, it helped turn the tide overwhelmingly in favor of Allied ground forces"

A majority of the Survey's members were civilians in positions of influence on the various committees of the survey. Only one position of some influence was given to a prominent military officer, USAAF General Orvil A. Anderson (who had been in the Air War Plans Division) and that only in an advisory capacity. Anderson was the only one on the survey board who knew about procedures of strategic bombing as Jimmy Doolittle's former deputy commander of operations. While the Board was not associated with any branch of the military, it was established by General Hap Arnold (chief of the USAF) along with Carl Spaatz (commander of Strategic Air Forces in Europe). Failing to obtain the prominent public figure he had hoped for, Arnold settled for Franklin D'Olier.

== Background ==
The strategic bombing effort against Germany had begun at the start of the war with British attacks on German naval facilities. After heavy losses in daylight raids, RAF Bomber Command moved to night attacks for protection from German fighter defenses. The Butt report identified that attacks on specific targets were inaccurate due to navigational and target identification issues. Bomber Command reorganized its efforts and targeted German industrial locations in general rather than aiming for any specific factory or industry under the Area Bombing directive. At the same time it invested in navigational aids and target marking. The total bomber force increased until the RAF was able to send 500 to 800 bombers against a single target city while still able to carry out minor raids and diversions against other areas. While in 1941 the RAF dropped about 46,000 tons of bombs, in 1944 it dropped 676,000 tons.

The USAAF entered the strategic bombing campaign with the intention of targeting specific industrial locations and to achieve precision bombing in the attacks needed to be made by daylight. Formations of bombers flew in a mutually self-defensive "combat box" where their many machine guns would be sufficient to drive off or bring down enemy fighters. In practice, due to many factors including the weather, bombing accuracy fell short - around 20% of bombs fell within the required 1000 ft of the aiming point.

The 1943 Casablanca conference led to the Allied strategic bombing organization: the USAAF would be working together with the RAF in the Combined Bomber offensive concentrating on particular areas of German industry but in such a way as their commanders interpreted their instructions. In 1942 and early 1943 the US 8th Air Force based in the UK had limited itself to raids close to base as it built up its strength and developed tactics. A second strategic force, the 15th Air Force, was created in the Mediterranean. Two further air forces, the Ninth Air Force in Western Europe and Twelfth Air Force in the Mediterranean, were focused on tactical operations in support of land forces.

The Allied strategy was to win the war by a land war in Europe rather than delivering a knock out blow by airpower alone, and the bombing strategy was in support of that. Over the course of the war, the focus of the Combined Bomber Offensive changed. As Germany was reliant on imported fuel and the synthetic generation of fuel from coal, attacks on such facilities were ordered. While some attacks were successful, the aircraft and crew losses were far beyond what could be sustained and further attacks were limited to within range of supporting fighters. In late 1943, the Pointblank directive specified the importance of reducing the ability of the Luftwaffe to influence the outcome of the cross-Channel invasion of France planned for mid-1944 by attacking the production of German fighter aircraft. Changes in tactics and availability of longer ranged fighters meant that the active Luftwaffe force was significantly diminished in early 1944 and the majority of the bombing offensive was directed instead against transport routes to prevent reinforcement of the defenses there.

== Europe ==
The Survey team was formed on 3 November 1944 by Secretary of War Henry L. Stimson in response to a directive by President Roosevelt. The headquarters was in Teddington, England, while its teams assessed the damage that had been done to targets as the allied armies took control of them. German records were analyzed for information and Germans interrogated including the remaining senior officials in the Nazi regime. The survey was not able to assess the effects in Soviet controlled areas.

The sociologist Charles Fritz was part of the survey team before going on to become a significant theorist in disaster research. The Survey was tasked with producing an impartial report on the effects of the bombing against Nazi Germany, in order to:

- aid the upcoming campaign against the Japanese home islands,
- establish a basis for evaluating the importance and potentialities of air power as an instrument of military strategy,
- provide data for planning the future development of the United States armed forces, and
- determine future economic policies with respect to the national defense.

The report, along with some 200 supporting documents, was dated 30 September 1945. However. it was not publicly released until 30 October 1945. The major conclusion of the report was that strategic bombing, particularly the destruction of the oil industry and truck manufacturing, had greatly contributed to the success of the Allies in World War II. However, despite the overall contribution of the bombing, the survey concluded that the impact of strategic bombing could not be separated from the general collapse of Germany in 1945.

The survey notes the effects on the German population: 3,600,000 "dwelling units", approximately 20% of total housing stock, were "destroyed or heavily damaged" with an estimated 300,000 civilians killed and a further 780,000 wounded. About seven and half million were left homeless. The survey found that German morale deteriorated after attacks with night bombing having a greater effect but although dissatisfaction with the war increased, under the German police state the will or means to oppose the leadership was absent.

In attacks on urban areas incendiary bombs were, ton for ton, four to five times as destructive as high explosive bombs. German fire defenses were inadequate and, in cases of fire storms, ineffective. While cities were provided with very strong bunkers (resistant to direct hits) as air raid shelters, there was insufficient capacity (enough for 8 million) and casualties outside the shelters among those sheltering in basements and cellars were high.

=== Successes ===
The Survey noted several successes against crucial industrial areas:

- "The Attack on Oil". This section of the USSBS presents the statistics for the Oil Plan portion of the bombing campaign against petroleum, oil, and lubrication (POL) products, particularly regarding the Leuna complex (largest of the plants) that produced a notable portion of the synthetic oil which as a result of bombing averaged an output of 9% of capacity from mid 1944 The survey reported the Nazi Germany position that the attacks were "catastrophic" with Speer writing on 30 June that aviation fuel was reduced by 90%. An attempt at rebuilding and dispersing production employing a workforce of 350,000 men was made but was incomplete by the end of the war From May 1944 production was less than consumption and reserves were drained. The Ardennes offensive of December 1944 was predicated on capturing Allied fuel to sustain it. The synthetic oil plants were also a source of nitrogen for German agriculture and this was heavily cut back (at first to 50%, then 25%, then altogether) in order to release nitrates for explosive production.
- Ammunition: Production fell markedly in 1944 and the arms industry shipped bombs and shells packed partly with rock salt, as Germany ran out of nitrate, a vital ingredient and methanol (another product of fuel synthesis). Finally, Albert Speer, head of the Nazi economy, shifted the last nitrogen from the war effort to agriculture because he believed the war was lost and next year's crops were more important.
- Truck manufacturing facilities were extensively bombed. Of the top three producers, Opel at Brandenburg, was completely shut down in one raid in August 1944 and never recovered. Daimler-Benz was decimated a month later. The third largest producer, Ford's German subsidiary at Cologne was never directly attacked, but production was sharply cut during the same period by elimination of its component supplies and the bombing of its power sources. By December 1944, production of trucks was reduced to 35 percent of the average for the first half of the year. After the war, General Motors, owner of Opel, successfully sued the US government for $32 million in damages sustained to its German plants (Ford Motor Company also demanded compensation from the U.S. government for "losses" due to bomb damage to its German subsidiary).
- U-boat (submarine) manufacturing was halted in early 1945.
- Disruption of transportation: German transport was dependent on the Reichsbahn railways and on waterways. Bombing from September disrupted movement of material and products. In February 1945 the Ruhr was completely isolated from supplies of coal.

=== Failures ===
The Survey also noted a number of failed or outcomes of limited success:

- Aviation production: "In 1944 the German air force is reported to have accepted a total of 39,807 aircraft of all types -- compared with 8,295 in 1939, or 15,596 in 1942 before the plants suffered any attack." According to the report, almost none of the aircraft produced in 1944 were used in combat and some may have been imaginary.
- Armoured fighting vehicle production "reached its wartime peak in December 1944, when 1,854 tanks and armoured vehicles were produced. This industry continued to have relatively high production through February 1945, but the effect [of bombing] again may have been to cause the industry to fall short of achievable production".
- Ball bearings: "There is no evidence that the attacks on the ball-bearing industry had any measurable effect on essential war production."
- "Secondary Campaigns" (Operation Chastise against German dams and Operation Crossbow against V-weapons sites): "The bombing of the launching sites being prepared for the V weapons delayed the use of V-1 appreciably. The attacks on the V-weapon experimental station at Peenemunde, however, were not effective; V-1 was already in production near Kassel and V-2 production had been moved to an underground plant. The breaking of the Mohne and the Eder dams, though the cost was small, also had limited effect."
- Steel: Bombing greatly reduced production within Germany in 1944 chiefly through damage to utilities the blast furnaces and mills depended on. The survey considered the loss was not decisive (and was overshadowed by general collapse of German economy)
- Consumer goods: The survey summary stated "In the early years of the war—the soft war period for Germany—civilian consumption remained high. Germans continued to try for both guns and butter. The German people entered the period of the air war well stocked with clothing and other consumer goods. "Although most consumer goods became increasingly difficult to obtain, Survey studies show that fairly adequate supplies of clothing were available for those who had been bombed out until the last stages of disorganization. Food, though strictly rationed, was in nutritionally adequate supply throughout the war. The Germans' diet had about the same calories as the British." Raids on Berlin destroyed half of German clothing industry.

The German power network had not been attacked as the Allied assessment was that it was well organised and resistant to bombing, The survey found that power production and distribution was known by the Germans to be vulnerable and the survey opined that if it had been attacked it would have had a severe effect on materiel.

=== On German production ===
The Survey concluded that one reason German production rose in so many areas was in part that the German economy did not go on a complete war footing until late 1942 and 1943. German strategy had been focused on short decisive campaigns with no thought to a sustained war and consequent production. Up until then, factories had been on a single shift in many industries and the German economy was generally inefficient and not operating at full capacity. They also noted that women's participation in the manufacturing field remained low, lower than during World War I. The sections of the Survey regarding the German production system remain one of the best resources on the topic.

German aircraft production increased as spare capacity in the industry was used, and dispersal of production increased resilience. The effective combat strength of the Luftwaffe did not increase despite the large numbers of aircraft available. In each of the three months at the start of 1944, over 1,000 fighters were claimed to have been shot down with a consequent loss of pilots. The survey did not identify what happened to the aircraft produced, the German "air generals" unable to explain it and it was supposed some were lost in transit or damaged on the ground with others unable to fly due to lack of fuel. By the start of 1945 fighter production was curtailed due to lack of fuel for all except the new jet fighters.

== Conclusions ==
In respect of the bombing campaign over Europe, the survey identified several points:

- The ability of the Allies to attack unhindered from the air meant by the last year of the war, Germany was finished.
- Domination of the air was necessary to allow effective strategic bombing of the German economy
- Despite the attacks, Germany was able to reorganize and take measures to mitigate some effects of the attacks
- Under state control, despite the attacks on them, the German people were resilient to the bombing campaign and that "power of a police state over its people cannot be underestimated."
- Germany was more concerned about attacks on infrastructure that supported several industries than attacks on any particular industry
- It was necessary to attack a target more than once
- American intelligence on the German economy at the start of war was inadequate and there was no coordination between military and other government organizations.
- Importance of Allied research, technological and production improvements to achieve "superiority in both numbers and quality of crews, aircraft, and equipment"
- "The achievements of Allied airpower were attained only with difficulty and great cost in men, material and effort. Its success depended on the courage, fortitude, and gallant action of the officers and men of the aircrews and commands. It depended also on a superiority in leadership, ability, and basic strength"

But it warned that the "No greater or more dangerous mistake could be made than to assume that the same policies and practices that won the War in Europe will be sufficient to win the next one-if there be another. The results achieved in Europe will not give the answer to future problems; they should be treated rather as signposts pointing the direction in which such answers may be found."

And concluded that "The great lesson to be learned in the battered towns of England and the ruined cities of Germany is that the best way to win a war is to prevent it from occurring."

== Pacific ==
After the European report was completed, as ordered by Truman in August 1945, the Survey turned its attention to the Pacific campaign. The report opens with a discussion of the Japanese strategic plans, which were based on an initial victory against the U.S. Navy which would upset any U.S. plans in the Pacific for an estimated 18 months to 2 years. During this time, they planned to "speedily extract bauxite, oil, rubber and metals from Malaya, Burma, the Philippines and the Dutch East Indies, and ship these materials to Japan for processing." They also noted the belief that high casualties would not be accepted by the U.S. democracy, and that if the initial campaigns were successful, a negotiated peace was possible.

The survey identified that there was no civilian control of the military nor coordination between Army and Navy. The Japanese Army and Japanese Navy pursued their own foreign policy, independent of the government, according to their own requirements and capacities.

=== Against shipping ===
The Survey received sufficient information to detail every ship used by the Japanese during the war. They noted that the Imperial Japanese Navy began the war with 381 warships of approximately 1,271,000 tons, and completed another 816 ships of 1,048,000 tons during the war. Of these, 1,744,000 tons were sunk; "625,000 tons were sunk by Navy and Marine aircraft, 375,000 tons by submarines, 183,000 tons by surface vessels, 55,000 tons by Army aircraft, and 65,000 tons by various agents".

The Japanese merchant fleet was likewise destroyed. They started the war with 6,000,000 tons of merchant ships over 500 tons gross weight, which was alone not sufficient to provide for the wartime economy. Another 4,100,000 tons were constructed, captured or requisitioned. However, 8,900,000 tons were sunk, the vast majority of their fleet. Of this, "54.7 percent of this total was attributable to submarines, 16.3 percent to carrier based planes, 10.2 percent to Army land-based planes and 4.3 percent to Navy and Marine land-based planes, 9.3 percent to mines (largely dropped by B-29s), less than 1 percent to surface gunfire and the balance of 4 percent to marine accidents." The Allied submarine campaign played the largest role, while naval mining by air in Operation Starvation also played a significant role, sinking or damaging more than 1,250,000 tons.

=== Against the home islands ===
In total, Allied aircraft dropped 656,400 tons of bombs on Japanese targets, 160,800 tons on the home islands. In Europe there were 2,770,000 tons dropped, and 1,415,745 tons on Germany specifically.

After initial attacks from high-altitude precision bombing in which less than 10% of the bombs fell near their targets, Allied air forces switched to low-level night-time incendiary attacks against Japanese cities. On the night of 9–10 March 1945, 16 square miles (41 km^{2}) of eastern Tokyo were burned out and tens of thousands were killed by U.S. Army Air Forces B-29s in Operation Meetinghouse. The Survey estimated that 88,000 died, while the Tokyo Fire Department estimated 97,000. Historian Richard Rhodes estimated more than 100,000, though journalist Mark Selden considered even this figure to be too low. In the following 10 days, a total of 31 square miles (80 km^{2}) were destroyed. The Survey notes that these attacks had little direct effect on manufacturing, with factories that were hit by bombs having less drop off in production than those that did not. However, they also noted that production dropped by 54% during this period due to the effects of bombing: the killing, injuring and dehousing of the workers as well as the destruction of the transportation network. Further, many of the houses destroyed in the bombing contained small shops that made parts for factories, so the bombing of residential districts also destroyed this decentralized manufacturing. They noted a precipitous reduction in food availability as well, dropping from about 2,000 calories per day at the start of the war, to 1,680 for industrial workers at the height of the campaign, and less for non-essential workers. The Survey found that civilian morale dropped across the country from the bombings, not confined to areas that were bombed, but that Japanese dedication to their Emperor prevented morale from inducing a desire to surrender. The Survey stated that Japanese leaders were partially influenced by low civilian morale, but only to the extent that it warranted concerns about maintaining the ruling class.

=== Atomic bombing ===
The Survey dedicates a separate section of the reports to the atomic bombings of Hiroshima and Nagasaki.

They noted that although the blast wave was of about the same pressure as that of a high-explosive bomb, the duration of the effect was longer and that brick buildings were collapsed as far as 7,300 feet (2,200 m) at Hiroshima and 8,500 feet (2,600 m) at Nagasaki, while traditional wood houses were about the same, while reinforced-concrete structures suffered structural damage or collapse up to 700 feet (210 m) at Hiroshima and 2,000 feet (610 m) at Nagasaki.

In Hiroshima (August 6, 1945), approximately 60,000 to 70,000 people were killed, and 50,000 were injured. This is out of a pre-war population of about 340,000 that had been reduced to 245,000 through evacuations. Of approximately 90,000 buildings in the city, 65,000 were rendered unusable and almost all the remainder received at least light superficial damage.

In Nagasaki (August 9, 1945), approximately 40,000 persons were killed or missing and a like number injured. This was from a population of about 285,000, which had been reduced to around 230,000 by August 1945. Of the 52,000 residential buildings in Nagasaki, 14,000 were totally destroyed and a further 5,400 badly damaged. The vast majority of Nagasaki's industrial output was from the Mitsubishi factories and steel plant, which were 58 and 78 percent destroyed, respectively.

Unlike Hiroshima, Nagasaki featured extensive bomb shelters in the form of tunnels cut into the sides of hills. "...all the occupants back from the entrances survived, even in those tunnels almost directly under the explosion. Those not in a direct line with the entrance were uninjured. The tunnels had a capacity of roughly 100,000 persons. Had the proper alarm been sounded, and these tunnel shelters been filled to capacity, the loss of life in Nagasaki would have been substantially lower."

The report also concluded that: "Based on a detailed investigation of all the facts, and supported by the testimony of the surviving Japanese leaders involved, it is the Survey's opinion that certainly prior to 31 December 1945, and in all probability prior to 1 November 1945, Japan would have surrendered even if the atomic bombs had not been dropped, even if Russia had not entered the war, and even if no invasion had been planned or contemplated." Military historian Gian Gentile disputed this counterfactual, stating that testimony from Japanese leaders in USSBS interrogations supported the likelihood of Japan continuing the war beyond November and December 1945. Gentile stated that survey authors chose not to publish such evidence, as it challenged their conclusions.

== Survey officers and controversy ==
Officers of the Survey
name	Europe (e) Japan (p)	career prior to 1945 [and after]
Franklin D'Olier, Chairman	ep	insurance (Prudential, WW I, American Legion)
Henry C. Alexander, Vice-Chairman	ep	banking (House of Morgan)
George W. Ball	e	attorney [banker and diplomat], official of the Lend Lease program
Harry L. Bowman	ep	
John Kenneth Galbraith	ep	economist and Harvard professor
Rensis Likert	ep	psychologist, insurance
Frank A. McNamee, Jr.	ep	attorney
Paul H. Nitze	ep	finance director of the Office of the Coordinator of Inter-American Affairs, chief of the Metals and Minerals Branch of the Board of Economic Warfare
Robert P. Russell	e	
Fred Searls, Jr.	ep	geologist
Monroe E. Spaght	p	PhD chemist, oil company executive[, later CEO and managing director of Shell]
Dr. Louis R. Thompson	p	
Theodore Paul Wright, Directors	ep	aeronautical engineer and administrator
Charles Codman Cabot, Secretary	e	attorney, associate justice of the Supreme Court of Massachusetts
Walter Wilds, Secretary	p	

The Forward to the Summary Report for the Pacific War said, "The United States Strategic Bombing Survey was established by the Secretary of War on 3 November 1944, pursuant to a directive from the late President Roosevelt. It was established for the purpose of conducting an impartial and expert study of the effects of our aerial attack on Germany, to be used in connection with air attacks on Japan and to establish a basis for evaluating air power as an instrument of military strategy, for planning the future development of the United States armed forces, and for determining future economic policies with respect to the national defense."

The surveys of both the European and Pacific Wars were managed by a team of a dozen civilians, support by "300 civilians, 350 officers, and 500 enlisted men", who followed closely the advance of the Allied forces, to search for written records of German decisions before they disappeared completely. Many of which were hidden, some even in coffins. Three of the leaders of the European team were replaced for the research in Japan, so the accompanying table of "Officers of the Survey" includes fifteen men. Those fifteen were selected as nonmilitary leaders, many of whom had even greater career success in supporting the development of strategic forces in the US military after the war than before.

A review of a biography of Galbraith said that the survey "found that, contrary to the claims of the U.S. Air Force [sic], (Note: The United States Air Force was created as a separate service from the USAAF on 18 September 1947) "Germany’s war production rose for much of the period when American and British air attacks were at their fiercest. An obituary of Galbraith for the free market economist Foundation for Economic Education said 'Galbraith wrote wittily, “Nothing in World War II air operations was subject to such assault as open agricultural land.” ... Galbraith’s boss, George Ball ... found something equally disturbing about the firebombing of cities. The RAF’s bombing of central Hamburg, for example, destroyed many lives and many businesses in the central city—restaurants, cabarets, department stores, banks, and more. What were the newly unemployed waiters, bank clerks, and entertainers to do? That’s right: seek jobs in the war plants on the edge of the cities “to get the ration cards that the Nazis thoughtfully distributed to workers there.” ... [T]he incredible destruction that the British and air forces wreaked on Germany, with the high loss of human life, didn’t even have the intended effect of slowing Germany's war-production machine. Galbraith had to fight hard to have the report published without it being rewritten to hide the essential points. “I defended it,” he later wrote, “with a maximum of arrogance and a minimum of tact.” ... Galbraith also visited Japan, where he analyzed the effect of the use of the atom bomb. He wrote: "The bombs fell after the decision had been taken by the Japanese government to surrender. That the war had to be ended was agreed by at a meeting of key members of the Supreme War Direction Council with the Emperor on June 20, 1945, a full six weeks before the devastation of Hiroshima. The next steps took time. The Japanese government had the usual bureaucratic lags as between decision and action."'

== More recent research ==
The introduction to the summary report of air power in Europe noted that, "Allied air power was called upon to play many roles-partner with the Navy over the sea lanes; partner with the Army in ground battle; partner with both on the invasion beaches; reconnaissance photographer for all; mover of troops and critical supplies; and attacker of the enemy's vital strength far behind the battle line." The summary report only discussed the latter: attacks on the enemy's vital strength far behind the battle line. Grant (2008) said, "The survey began in no small part as a way to look at the major targeting controversies (rail vs. oil, and so forth) that had so often consumed the attention of top Allied planners and leaders. Its original intent was to sweep up lessons from Europe for use in the ongoing war with Japan."

The survey reported that the rate of production of war materials by Germany actually increased in response to strategic bombing by the Allies. Destroyed factories were quickly reconstituted in hardened sites. John Kenneth Galbraith, who was one of the "Officers" of the USSBS, wrote, "Nothing in World War II air operations was subject to such assault as open agricultural land." When Allied bombs fell in cities like central Hamburg, they destroyed many lives and often many businesses in the central city—restaurants, cabarets, department stores, banks, and more. The newly unemployed waiters, bank clerks, and entertainers took jobs in the war plants. (Note: Galbraith's position on this were highly controversial and unpopular with many of the other Officers of the Survey. Henderson (2006) wrote, "Galbraith had to fight hard to have his report published without it being rewritten to hide the essential points. 'I defended it,' he wrote, 'with a maximum of arrogance and a minimum of tact.'")

In other words, the Allies may have obtained roughly the same benefits from strategic bombing of "the enemy's vital strength far behind the battle line" as Hitler gained from The Blitz, namely nothing—or worse: increasing their enemies' will to resist. (Note: Tom Harrisson, one of the leaders of the Mass-Observation project, which collected thousands of observations by British volunteers during World War II, concluded that the Germans gained nothing from their investment in bombing British civilian targets as part of "The Blitz" (1940-41). Before "The Blitz", they may not have been happy about having their air force destroyed by the Nazis, but they were also not eager to put their lives on the line to support a hereditary aristocracy that just over 20 years earlier had wasted a substantial portion of a generation of young men in a senseless war. However, as their homes were being destroy and their neighbors killed or wounded by German bombs, ordinary British men and women did not all rabidly support Churchill's exhortation, "We shall never surrender", but they continued to work, and they took action to ensure that essential services were provided when their official leaders failed to do so.)

Pape (1996) studied the use of air power from the First World War into the 1990s. He concluded that air power could be effective in direct support of ground operations, but strategic bombing was a waste. Pape's conclusions were supported by a more formal quantitative analysis of a larger set of cases by Horowitz and Reiter (2001). (Note: Horowitz and Reiter's study used data compiled by the RAND Corporation for a study funded by the U.S. Air Force (Byman, Daniel; Waxman, Matthew Curtis; Larson, Eric V. (1999), Air Power as a Coercive Instrument (PDF), RAND Corporation, Wikidata Q114832489). RAND failed to confirm Pape's claims; if they had reached the same conclusions as Horowitz and Reiter (2001), it might have threatened their ability to get more funds from the U.S. Air Force) The claims of Galbraith, Pape (1996) and Horowitz and Reiter (2001) are controversial.

== See also ==
- Aerial bombing of cities
- Area bombardment
- Carpet bombing
- Civilian casualties of strategic bombing
- Debate over the atomic bombings of Hiroshima and Nagasaki
- Technology during World War II
