= Patricia Draves =

American chemist and academic administrator

15th President of Monmouth College
- Incumbent
- Assumed office July 1, 2024
- Preceded by: Clarence Wyatt

18th President of Graceland University
- In office June 2017 – June 2024
- Preceded by: John Sellars
- Succeeded by: Joel Shrock

Personal details
- Born: Rhode Island, U.S.
- Education: Mount Holyoke College (BA); University of Illinois at Urbana–Champaign (PhD)

Patricia Draves is an American medical researcher and academic administrator who was the 18th president of Graceland University in Lamoni, Iowa. She became the President of Monmouth College in Monmouth, Illinois in July 2024.

== Early life and education ==
Draves is a native of Rhode Island. She earned a Bachelor of Arts in chemistry from Mount Holyoke College and a Ph.D. in biophysical chemistry from the University of Illinois at Urbana–Champaign in 1991. She then completed her post-doctoral fellowship at the University of Texas at Austin, where she studied chemotherapy treatment.

== Career ==
In 1993, Draves began her academic career as a professor at the University of Central Arkansas, where she eventually became Dean of undergraduate studies. She then helped establish a new biochemistry program at Monmouth College. Draves then joined the faculty of the University of Mount Union as vice president for academic affairs in 2006. Draves became the 18th president of Graceland University in June 2017, succeeding John Sellars, who had served for ten years in the position. In April 2024, she was announced as the incoming 15th president of Monmouth College.
