= Drury University =

Private college in Springfield, Missouri, US

- Former names: Springfield College (1873–1874); Drury College (1874–2000)
- Type: Private university
- Established: 1873; 153 years ago
- Religious affiliation: United Church of Christ; Christian Church (Disciples of Christ)
- Endowment: $86.4 million (2025)
- President: Jeff Frederick
- Students: 1,590
- Location: Springfield, Missouri, U.S. 37.2196°N 93.2857°W
- Campus: Urban, 88 acres (35.6 ha)
- Colors: Scarlet & grey
- Nickname: Panthers
- Website: drury.edu

Drury University is a private university in Springfield, Missouri, United States. The university's mission statement describes itself as "church-related". It enrolls about 1,590 undergraduate and graduate students in six master's programs and 716 students in the College of Continuing Professional Studies. In 2013, the Drury Panthers men's basketball team won the NCAA Men's Division II Basketball Championship. The Drury men's and women's Panthers have 22 NCAA Division II National Championships between them, in addition to numerous NAIA titles before moving to the NCAA.

== History ==
Drury was founded as Springfield College in 1873 by Congregationalist church missionaries in the mold of other Congregationalist universities such as Dartmouth College and Yale University. Nathan Morrison, Samuel Drury, and James and Charles Harwood provided the school's initial endowment and organization; Samuel Drury's gift was the largest of the group and the school was soon renamed as Drury College in honor of Drury's recently deceased son on December 10, 1874.

The early curriculum emphasized educational, religious, and musical strengths. Students came to the new college from a wide area including the Indian Territories of Oklahoma. The first graduating class included four women.

When classes began in 1873, they were held in a single building on a campus occupying less than 1 1/2 acres (0.61 ha). Twenty-five years later the 40-acre (16.2 ha) campus included Stone Chapel, the President's House and three academic buildings. Today, the university occupies a 115-acre (46.5 ha) campus, including the original historic buildings.

Drury College became Drury University on January 1, 2000.

=== Religious affiliations ===
Drury was founded by Congregationalist missionaries and remains affiliated with the United Church of Christ. It has also been affiliated with the Christian Church (Disciples of Christ) since the founding of the Drury School of Religion in 1909.

=== Presidents ===
- 2024–present: Jeff Frederick
- 2023–2024: John Beuerlein
- 2016–2023: J. Timothy Cloyd
- 2013–2016: David Manuel
- 2007–2013: Todd Parnell
- 2005–2007: John Sellars
- 1983–2004: John E. Moore Jr.
- 1981–1983: Norman C. Crawford Jr.
- 1977–1980: John M. Bartholomy
- 1971–1976: William Edward Everheart
- 1968–1970: Alfred O. Canon
- 1964–1967: Earnest Brandenburg
- 1940–1963: James F. Findlay
- 1917–1939: Thomas Nadal
- 1913–1916: J.J. McMurtry
- 1907–1913: Joseph Henry George
- 1905–1907: J. Edward Kirbye
- 1893–1905: Homer T. Fuller
- 1888–1892: Francis T. Ingalls
- 1873–1885: Nathan J. Morrison

== Academics ==
Drury is accredited by the Higher Learning Commission. The university offers 54 undergraduate majors and several professional degrees through the Hammons School of Architecture, Breech School of Business Administration, and School of Education & Child Development.

Drury is a residential university. Full-time students live on campus until they reach the age of 21, unless they meet specific criteria to be exempt from the housing policy.

=== Study abroad ===
Almost half of the student body studies overseas at some point in short-term, semester, or year-long programs. Foreign learning is a requirement for most students with majors in the schools of Business and Architecture.

Drury maintained a satellite campus in Aegina, Greece. The center closed in May 2021.

== Athletics ==
Drury's NCAA Division II intercollegiate athletic teams compete in men's and women's basketball, men's and women's cross country, men's and women's Track and Field, men's and women's golf, men's and women's soccer, men's and women's swimming, men's and women's tennis, men's baseball, men's wrestling, women's softball, women's volleyball, men's bowling, and women's bowling, women's triathlon and soon to be men's triathlon.

The school was a founding member of the Heartland Conference. In the fall of 2005, the Drury Panthers joined the Great Lakes Valley Conference.

== KDRU-LP student-run radio ==
KDRU-LP (98.1 FM) is a low-power student-run radio station owned by Drury University. Licensed by the Federal Communications Commission (FCC) in 2016, the station broadcasts with an effective radiated power of 47 watts. Its primary signal covers most of Springfield, while reception in the immediate surrounding communities depends on the topography. All of KDRU's on-air hosts must be university students.
