= Walden University =

American for-profit online university

Coordinates: 44°58′52″N 93°15′56″W

- Seal of Walden University
- Motto: Education for Good
- Type: Private for-profit online university
- Established: 1970; 56 years ago
- President: Michael Betz
- Faculty: 242 full-time and 2,300 part-time (fall 2023)
- Students: 44,223 (fall 2023)
- Undergraduates: 7,362 (fall 2023)
- Postgraduates: 36,861 (fall 2023)
- Location: Minneapolis, Minnesota, United States
- Campus: Primarily online
- Website: www.waldenu.edu

Walden University is a private, for-profit online university headquartered in Minneapolis, Minnesota. It offers bachelor's, master's, doctoral, and specialist degrees. The university is owned by Covista, which purchased the university in August 2021. The institution is accredited by the Higher Learning Commission.

The university is classified among "Doctoral Universities: Doctoral/Professional Universities". Walden is a high-volume granter of healthcare administration master's degrees, Master of Science in Nursing degrees, and public health doctoral degrees in the U.S., according to the National Center for Education Statistics IPEDS database.

== History ==
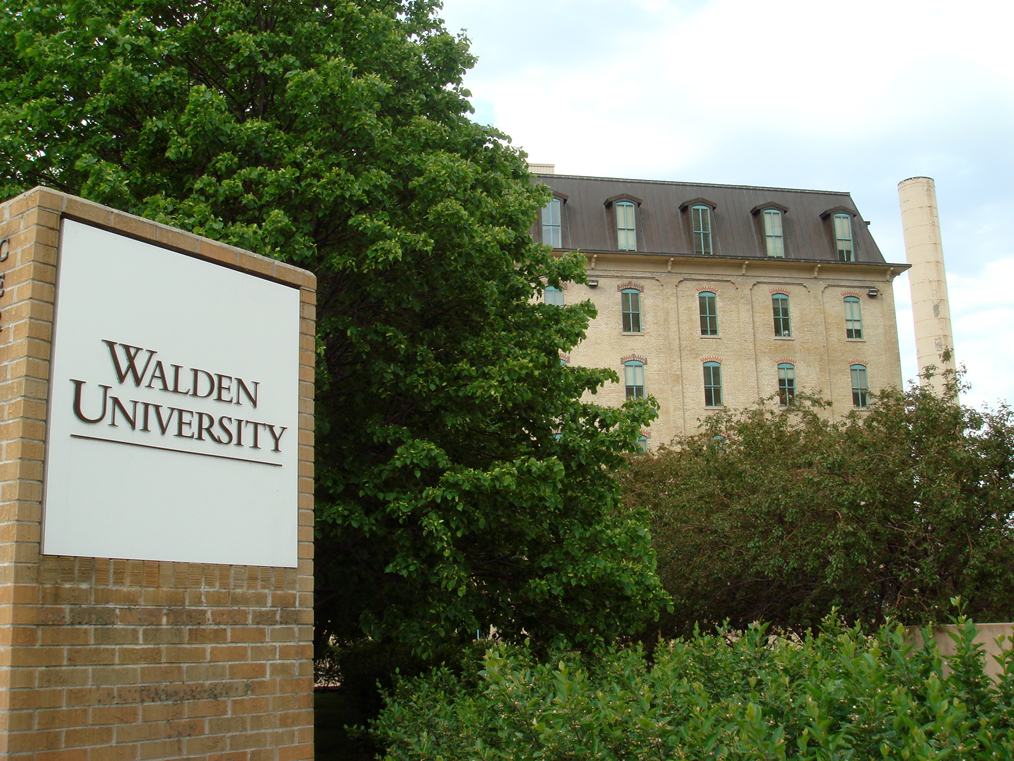
Walden University's former headquarters in the Mill District of Minneapolis

Walden was established in 1970 by two New York teachers, Bernie and Rita Turner, who created a program for working adults/teachers to pursue doctoral degrees. In the summer of 1971, the first classes took place in Naples, Florida, focusing primarily on school administrators. The initial classes allowed students to form dissertation topics with their faculty partners before returning to work at their respective schools while completing their dissertations. In 1972, Walden conferred its first degrees: 46 PhDs and 24 EdDs at its first commencement in Naples.

In 1979, the Minnesota Higher Education Coordinating Board licensed Walden to grant PhDs and EdDs in the state and in 1982 the school moved its headquarters to Minneapolis. In 1990, the North Central Association of Colleges and Schools accredited the university.

Sylvan Learning Systems, Inc., purchased 41 percent of Walden University in 2001, gaining a controlling interest in 2002. In 2004, Sylvan Learning Systems became Laureate Education, Inc.

Jonathan Kaplan served as CEO from 2007 to 2018. Kaplan previously served three years as economic policy adviser to President Bill Clinton. Clinton was named an Honorary Chancellor of Laureate International Universities from 2010 to 2015 for which he made more than $17 million. Clinton was the keynote speaker at Walden University's commencement on July 30, 2011.

In 2016, Adam Looney and Constantine Yannelis estimated that Walden University student loan debt was the second highest in the US, with 120,275 students owing an estimated $9.8 billion. While the 5-year student default rate was low (7 percent), the percentage of balance repaid on the loans was 0 percent.

On April 8, 2016, the Minnesota Office of Higher Education (MOHE) notified Walden University that its renewal application to participate in the State Authorization Reciprocity Agreements (SARA) was rejected because Walden University did not have an institutional federal financial composite score computed by the US Department of Education (DOE). In the absence of an institution-level financial composite score calculated by DOE, MOHE viewed Walden's parent company Laureate's financial composite score, calculated based on its global operations, which did not exceed 1.5.

In October 2016, NBC News reported that the Minnesota Office of Higher Education was investigating a spike in student complaints. NBC News further reported that former students had filed a class action suit against the school for prolonging their enrollments for years, "until they were left hundreds of thousands of dollars in debt and still short of a degree."

In September 2020, Adtalem Global Education began the process of purchasing Walden University. According to Higher Education Dive "Two investment firms, Engine Capital and Hawk Ridge Partners, wrote in an open letter...that they were "severely disappointed" with the board's decision to purchase Walden, calling the college a 'substantially inferior asset.'"

Announced in a press release by Walden in 2020, Walden University’s College of Management and Technology (CMT) and School of Management earned a Silver Achievement Award from the Accreditation Council for Business Schools and Programs (ACBSP).

In 2021, Adtalem Global Education Inc bought Walden University.

In May 2022, Michael Betz was appointed as the president of Walden University. Betz previously served as a partner at McKinsey & Co. and was a leader in McKinsey's higher education and growth transformation practices.

=== African American student population ===
Walden University graduates a high number of Black/African American students. Between 2011 and 2015, it awarded the highest number of doctoral degrees to Black students out of universities in the United States, followed by Howard University. According to the NCSES's 2020 Survey of Earned Doctorates, Walden University granted doctorates to 1,383 Black or African American students between 2016 and 2020. This was the highest number of Black doctoral recipients granted by a U.S. university during that period and represented about 37% of the 3,726 total doctoral students that graduated from Walden during that same period.

In January, 2022, the civil rights law firm Relman Colfax and the National Student Legal Defense Network filed a class-action lawsuit against Walden University that alleges that Walden engages in “reverse redlining” by targeting its advertisements to Black and female students while misrepresenting the costs and credit hours required for its doctoral degrees. On October 17, 2024, a settlement of $28,500,000 was approved by the Maryland District Court to be paid out to eligible former students.

== Institutional finances ==
Walden University is a certified Benefit Corporation.

As of 2016, it received more than 75% of its income from the US government, including more than $750 million a year for graduate student loans, the largest amount for any US college. Walden University has been under heightened cash monitoring from the US Department of Education since 2016.

== Academics ==
Walden University consists of seven colleges and one school:

- Richard W. Riley College of Education and Human Sciences
- College of Management and Human Potential
- College of Health Sciences and Public Policy
- College of Nursing
- College of Social and Behavioral Health
- College of Allied Health
- College of Psychology and Community Services
- School of Interdisciplinary Undergraduate Studies

=== Accreditation ===
Walden University is institutionally accredited by the Higher Learning Commission. The Richard W. Riley School of Education and Leadership is accredited by the Council for the Accreditation of Educator Preparation (CAEP).

Professionally accredited programs include:

- The PhD in Counselor Education and Supervision; MS in Marriage, Couple, and Family Counseling; MS in Clinical Mental Health Counseling; MS in School Counseling; and MS in Addiction Counseling programs are accredited by the Council for Accreditation of Counseling and Related Educational Programs (CACREP).
- The Doctor of Nursing Practice (DNP), Master of Science in Nursing (MSN), and Bachelor of Science in Nursing programs are all accredited by the Commission on Collegiate Nursing Education (CCNE), a national accrediting agency recognized by the U.S. Department of Education and the Council for Higher Education Accreditation.
- The BS in Business Administration, BS in accounting, Master of Business Administration (MBA), MS in accounting, Doctor of Business Administration (DBA), and PhD in Management programs are accredited by the Accreditation Council for Business Schools and Programs (ACBSP).
- The MS in Project Management program is accredited by the PMI Global Accreditation Center (GAC) for Project Management Education Programs.
- The Bachelor of Social Work and Master of Social Work is Council of Social Workers Education (CSWE) accredited, an accreditation needed to get licensed as a social worker in most states.
- The BS in Information Technology is accredited by ABET, the internationally recognized accreditor for college and university programs in applied science, computing, engineering, and engineering technology.
- The Master of Public Health and Doctor of Public Health are accredited by the Council on Education for Public Health (CEPH).
- Walden University is designated as a National Center of Academic Excellence in Cyber Defense Education by the National Security Agency and the Department of Homeland Security.

=== Unaccredited professional programs ===
- Walden University's PhD specializations in Clinical Psychology and Counseling Psychology are not accredited by the American Psychological Association (APA) and have not received designation by the Association of State and Provincial Psychology Boards/National Register (ASPPB/NR), which are requirements for licensure in some states. The MS and six other PhD in psychology specializations offered by Walden are not governed by APA.

=== Student outcomes ===
According to the US Department of Education's College Scorecard, Walden University has a 32 percent graduation rate and a median earnings average of $83,334.

== Publications ==
Walden University sponsors several peer-reviewed and refereed academic journals.

- International Journal of Applied Management and Technology (ISSN 1544-4740)
- Journal of Social Change ( ISSN 1931-1540)
- Journal of Social, Behavioral, and Health Sciences ( ISSN 1948-3260)
- Journal of Educational Research and Practice
- Journal of Social Work in the Global Community
- Journal of Excellence in Nursing and Healthcare Practice

== Alumni and faculty ==
According to College Navigator, Walden University had 281 full-time instructors and 2,277 part-time instructors for 49,441 students in 2024.

=== Notable alumni ===
- John Antonakis, Swiss professor of organizational behavior
- Maxine Asher, American pseudoscientist
- Sherri Brantley, American politician
- Erica Crawley, American politician
- Chandra Dillard, American politician
- Thomas A. Drake
- Marco Erickson, American politician
- Kathleen Fontaine, American physicist
- Russ Hogue, American kickboxer
- Monique Holsey-Hyman, American social worker and politician
- Derrick Jackson, American politician
- Yehiel Mark Kalish, American rabbi and politician
- Thet Thet Khine, Burmese politician and physician
- Louis LaPierre, Canadian ecologist
- Jacob Lozada, former Assistant Secretary of the United States Department of Veterans Affairs
- Howard McDonnell, American politician
- Earle Newton, American historian
- Oluwatoyin Sakirat Madein, Accountant-General of the Federation of Nigeria
- Kishore Shallow, President of Cricket West Indies
- Joan Swart, South African psychologist and politician
- George Wajackoyah, Kenyan politician
- Mutryce Williams, Kittian ambassador
- Elinor Wilson, former president of Assisted Human Reproduction Canada

=== Notable faculty ===
- Cynthia Baum, former president of Walden
- David Clinefelter, academic administrator
- Rocky Dwyer, Canadian business scholar
- David G. Iadevaia, professor of astronomy
- Robert Levasseur, management scholar
- Dave Richard Palmer, former president of Walden
- Robert H. Scales, former president of Walden
- Dinesh Sharma, American social scientist
