= Sikh Park =

Canadian Sikh cartoon series

- Created by: Dalbir Singh
- Inspired by: South Park

Production
- Producer: sikhchic.com (originally)

Sikh Park is a Sikh cartoon series from Canada that is a spoof of South Park. The cartoon has been described as mixing the "cute" and "simple" appearance of South Park with a unique version of Sikh humour.

== History ==
Dalbir Singh was a graduate of Calcutta University and worked as the creative director of Ogilvy & Mather whilst he resided in Budapest, Hungary. As a child, Dalbir often drew cartoons, some of his political cartoons made their way into local Indian newspapers. Dalbir recalls that growing up as a child in India, there was little else to do other than cricket, so he and his friends passed the time by reading cartoons, and books, and creating artwork.

Dalbir Singh invented "Sikh Park", based on the popular cartoon South Park, to transgress prevailing stereotypes about Sikhs. Dalbir Singh had never actually watched an episode of South Park before creating Sikh Park as he had been living in non-English speaking countries for around a decade, where the show was not popular, around the time he created Sikh Park. There had already been a Sikh comic at that time called Sikh Toons but it was geared toward political content and Dalbir wanted to make a cartoon that covered everyday humour that was plain, simple, and relatable.

The cartoon originated from the website sikhchic.com after it opened up a section dedicated to humour. The early running of the cartoon series was also published on MySpace. Whilst residing in Canada, Dalbir was friends with sikhchic.com's creator, Tapishar Sher Singh. Sikhchic.com is a website dedicated to Sikh art and culture, Dalbir was helping with the design of the website. Dalbir came up with the idea of adding a humour section to the website, similar to traditional newspapers. Originally planning on naming the cartoon Karol Bagh, it was ultimately decided against because Westerners may not understand the meaning of that name. Then they thought of naming the cartoon Karol Park, ultimately deciding upon Sikh Park.

Dalbir was inspired to create the comic after Sikhs began facing attacks and discrimination in the aftermath of the September 11 attacks, to show that Sikhs are normal, progressive, fun, and witty. Dalbir wanted to combat the prevailing 'sardar ji' type jokes that are commonly circulated to show that more positive jokes involving Sikhs are possible. Dalbir had been dismayed by the popular perception of Sikhs, who were joked about in magazines, websites, and even Bollywood films. The initial feedback from the community to the comic was positive. Initially, the cartoon heavily imitated South Park but it began to form its unique style over time as its popularity increased, due to conscious efforts by its creator. Dalbir claims he comes up with the ideas for its content on his own but admits as of late it is difficult to think of new ideas. Dalbir works in the advertising business full-time, so there have been periods where Sikh Park has not been updated with new content for periods as long as 6–7 months. Dalbir states that it is difficult to return to making new comics for Sikh Park after long intervals. Dalbir admits that the comic series has been slow to grow, which he attributes to the difficulty he has with remaining active online constantly. Sikh Park has collaborated with musicians and artists.

Whilst the cartoon was created with the intention that it was to be enjoyed by diasporic Sikhs and NRI Sikhs, many Desis from different backgrounds enjoy it. After Dalbir moved to India, he Indianized Sikh Park so it could be more relatable to actual Indians living in India.

In 2015, Dalbir expressed hopes that he wishes Sikh Park could become an animated show someday but that it would require funds. He has expressed openness to bringing in other editors, such as writers and animators, for the cartoon. Presently, the comic series is only present on social media channels. The Facebook page of Sikh Park has over 30,000 followers whilst its Instagram page has over 16,000 followers.

In 2022, Dalbir was approached by a political party based in Punjab, India to run a series covering the party's 2022 assembly election campaign in Punjab, but Dalbir refused to intertwine his artistic creation with politics. He also does not Sikh Park to become commercialized and prefers that it remain powered by passion instead. When Dalbir went to a Comic Con convention, many people queried him on why he never released any Sikh Park-themed merchandise but it was not something Dalbir had in-mind. Recently, Dalbir delved into NFTs.

In July 2022, Dalbir stated that he had dreams of producing Sikh Park as a web series with real people, perhaps through Netflix. However, his career occupies much of his time and nothing of the like has transpired yet.

== Style and themes ==
The cartoon is described as "colourful, quirky, and lighthearted". It does not halt itself from taking "gleeful digs" at perceived idiosyncrasies within the Sikh community. Many of the jokes in Sikh Park are about turbans. A common theme in the cartoon is a young Sikh boy with his trendy grandfather who is skilled at enjoying life. Initially, the comic covered topics related to the Sikh diaspora, such as racial discrimination (an example being Sikh experiences being screened at airport terminals and being targeted for claimed "random checks"). However, as the cartoon began to localize to India, its content was generalized for mass-appeal. The cartoon now mostly covers topics the general Desi community can relate to, such as pop culture, music, politics, and food, but also the daily happenings in typical Sikh families. Sikh Park also ran a pro-LGBTQ comic series. To avoid offending people on religious grounds, Dalbir focuses on creating comedy out of situations, not people.

It typically takes Dalbir around two hours to create a Sikh Park comic strip after an idea comes to mind.

== See also ==
- Humour in Sikhism
