= Ahmed Idris =

Nigerian Accountant (born 1960)

Ahmed idris

Accountant General of the Federation
- In office 25 June 2015 – 19 May 2023
- Preceded by: Jonah Ogunniyi Otunla
- Succeeded by: Oluwatoyin Madein

Personal details
- Born: 25 November 1960 (age 65) Kano State, Nigeria

Ahmed Idris (born 25 November 1960) is a Nigerian financial accountant who served as the accountant general of Nigeria. He was appointed accountant general on 25 June 2015, to succeed Jonah Ogunniyi Otunla who was sacked by president Muhammadu Buhari on allegedly misappropriating N2.5 billion of security agencies’ funds. Idris was re-appointed accountant general after Buhari won a second term in 2019 and was suspended from office on May 18 2022 by the Nigerian finance minister for misappropriating the fund of 80 Billion naira.

Prior to his appointment as AGF, he was a director in the Federal Ministry of Mines and Steel. He is a member of the Association of National Accountant of Nigeria (ANAN).

== Controversies ==
=== ₦80 billion fraud ===
On May 16, 2022, the Economic and Financial Crimes Commission arrested Idris in Kano State over his failure to honour an invitation to explain to the commission how a total of eighty billion naira was spent by his office on bogus and fictitious contracts awarded to cronies, friends and family members. EFCC stated in a press release that Idris laundered the funds through real estate investments in Kano and Abuja. In response to his arrest, the government suspended Idris indefinitely from his duties in order to allow a proper investigation.

=== Lack of NBET oversight ===
In September 2019, Idris was accused of absconding on his office's oversight duties over the Marilyn Amobi-run Nigerian Bulk Electricity PLC (NBET). Amobi was long accused of corruption along with workplace abuse and intimidation of subordinates leading reporters from the International Centre for Investigative Reporting to note that Idris' office had not audited NBET since Amobi had become managing director in 2016. The previous independent audit was also from before Amobi took office in breach of financial regulations over government-owned companies which state that audits must be annual. Further questions were raised when it was noted that the 2018 NBET budget earmarked ₦43,565,908 for a 2017 audit that never took place; further money was allocated for nonexistent audits in 2018 and 2019 as well. Further reports also showed that Idris had sent staff from his office to NBET in another breach of regulations. Idris did not respond to requests for comment on the controversy.

=== Mandatory retirement age ===
According to civil service rules, career civil servants must retire either at the age of 60 or having worked for 35 years, whichever comes first; Idris did not retire once turning 60 in November 2020, instead lobbying senators, governors, and emirs to convince President Buhari to retain Idris before writing to SGF Boss Mustapha seeking "clarification" on his status. Idris claimed to be a political appointee not bound by civil service rule while the Association of Senior Civil Servants of Nigeria and its president, Bola Audu Innocent claimed Idris was a civil servant legally required to retire. Ultimately, Buhari retained Idris past the mandatory retirement date of November 25, 2020, with Minister of Labour and Employment Chris Ngige stating after a meeting with the ASCSN that Buhari's re-appointment of Idris in 2019 for a four-year term meant Idris was not bound by the civil service retirement age.

In January 2021, a lawsuit was filed by Incorporated Trustees Of Youth Empowerment And Equal Justice asking the Federal High Court to remove Idris from his position and force him to return his post-November 2020 salaries to the government. As of March 2021, the lawsuit is still ongoing.

=== Missing ₦106bn from MDAs ===
In April 2021, the Socio-Economic Rights and Accountability Project (SERAP) petitioned Attorney General and Minister of Justice Abubakar Malami to probe Idris after SERAP discovered over ₦106 billion missing from the budgets of ministries, departments, and agencies (MDAs) in 2018. SERAP found the money missing after reviewing the 2018 Office of the Auditor General for the Federation report and requested that Malami ask Idris along with Minister of Finance, Budget and National Planning Zainab Ahmed "to explain why they allegedly failed to ensure strict compliance with relevant legislation, rules and regulations across all MDAs, despite the warning and recommendations by the Auditor-General."

=== Property acquisitions in office ===
While serving as Accountant-General, Idris bought several properties worth multi-billion naira without a clear source for the funds. Gezawa Commodity Market Limited and Gezawa Integrated Farms Limited were acquired by Idris during his time in office with both companies having Idris' family members on their boards and as major shareholders. Idris also bought the Sokoto Hotel in Kano for ₦500 million before ordering it demolished and a shopping mall built on the site. The Academic Staff Union of Universities along with journalists asked Idris to explain the source of the money used to buy the properties.

=== False claim to House committee ===
On May 25, 2021, when Idris testified under oath before the House ad hoc committee on recovered loot, he falsely claimed that £4.2 million in recovered funds that were stolen by former Delta Governor James Ibori had been returned to the Delta State government. Idris stated, "it was paid to Delta State...any recovery arising from looted funds from a particular state goes to the state. State governors will not even allow it to fly. They will take the federal government to court. We pay them their money." However, Lauretta Onochie, a media aide to Buhari, later said the money was not sent to Delta State as a transfer to the state government was not part of the repatriation agreement with the United Kingdom. Idris quickly recanted, saying, "for now, no money has been returned to Delta state...the issue of the £4.2m Ibori loot has not been properly resolved." It was later noted that Idris' lie may have been a jailable offense as lying under oath to a House committee can be tried as perjury.
