= Removal from the Order of Canada =

Honors membership revocations

Appointees to the Order of Canada can have their membership revoked if the order's advisory council determines a member's actions have brought dishonour to the order. Nine people have been removed from the Order of Canada: Alan Eagleson, David Ahenakew, T. Sher Singh, Steve Fonyo, Garth Drabinsky, Conrad Black, Ranjit Chandra, Johnny Issaluk and Buffy Sainte-Marie. The formal removal process is performed by the Advisory Council of the Order of Canada, though it can be initiated by any citizen of Canada.

Eagleson was removed from the order after being jailed for fraud in 1998; Ahenakew was removed in 2005, after being convicted of promoting antisemitic hatred in 2002; Singh was removed after the revocation of his law licence for professional misconduct; Fonyo was removed due to numerous criminal convictions; Drabinsky was removed in 2012 after being found guilty of fraud and forgery in Ontario; Black was removed in 2014 after being convicted of fraud and obstruction of justice in the United States; Chandra was removed in 2015 for committing research fraud; Issaluk was removed in 2022 following sexual misconduct allegations; Sainte-Marie was removed in 2025 after a CBC investigation reported she had been falsely claiming an Indigenous identity.

== Policy ==
Paragraph 25, section C, of the Constitution of the Order of Canada allows the Governor General of Canada to remove a person from the order by issuing an ordinance based on a decision of the Advisory Council of the Order of Canada. This decision is based on "evidence and guided by the principle of fairness and shall only be made after the Council has ascertained the relevant facts relating to the case under consideration."

A member of the order can be removed for being convicted of a criminal offense, or if the conduct of the person deviates significantly from recognized standards and is seen as undermining the credibility, integrity, or relevance of the order.

A member of the order can be removed if they have been subjected to an official sanction by an adjudicating body, professional association, or other organization. Official sanctions can include fines, reprimands, or disbarment (as was the case for Alan Eagleson and T. Sher Singh). However, the only punishment the advisory council can issue is removal from the Order of Canada.

== Procedure ==
The removal process begins by sending a written petition to the deputy secretary of the chancellery or by the deputy secretary initiating the process himself/herself. If the petition was started by a citizen, the claim could be judged as valid or invalid. If it is invalid, the deputy secretary will consult with the secretary general of the order and a letter will be sent to the petitioner explaining their decision. If it is valid, the petition will be sent by the secretary general to the advisory council.

The advisory council now has the decision to either continue or to stop the removal process. If it stops, the secretary general will notify the petitioner. If the council sees reasonable grounds for the process to continue, the removal-nominee will go through the remainder of the removal process.

The secretary general will send a registered letter to the removal-nominee that allegations were filed against them and their status in the Order of Canada is under consideration by the advisory council. The letter also gives the removal-nominee the options of responding to the allegations or to resign from the order.

If the removal-nominee decides to leave the order on their own, they will notify the secretary general of their decision. If the removal-nominee decides to challenge the allegations, either they or their authorized representative will respond to the allegations within the time limit set in the notification letter. Whatever action the removal-nominee takes, if any, the process will be handed back to the advisory council for further consideration. Once the advisory council has made their decision, they will send a report to the governor general explaining their findings and their recommendations. In accordance with convention, the governor general must accept the recommendation of the advisory council and will either notify the person that they will remain in the order in good standing or issue an ordinance terminating a person's membership in the order. Once the ordinance has been published, the person must return all Order insignia to the secretary general of the order and their name will be removed from all records held by the chancellery. The former member also loses the right to use their post-nominal letters in their names and loses the use of the order motto, ribbon, and medal on their personal coat of arms.

== Involuntary removal from the order ==
At the time of Johnny Issaluk's removal from the Order of Canada in 2022, there have been seven other individuals who were removed from the Order.

=== Alan Eagleson ===
Alan Eagleson was appointed to the rank of Officer of the Order of Canada April 20, 1989, for his work to promote ice hockey. While serving as the head of the National Hockey League Players' Association, he was accused of defrauding players out of money. Other charges included racketeering, embezzlement, and obstruction of justice with 34 total charges in the United States and 8 in Canada.

In January 1998, Eagleson pleaded guilty to three counts of mail fraud in the US. In that same month, Eagleson was disbarred in Canada. In February, the Governor General at the time, Roméo LeBlanc, signed an ordinance that removed Eagleson from the order. Eagleson became the first person to be removed from the order.

The decision to terminate Eagleson's membership in the order was gazetted on March 14, 1998.

During his sentencing in July 1998, Eagleson wore his Order of Canada lapel pin, despite the fact it was already stripped from him by that time. However, when asked to return the order, Eagleson did so within a week of the demand being made.

=== David Ahenakew ===
David Ahenakew was appointed to the grade of Member in December 1978 for his longtime "service to Indians and Métis in Saskatchewan culminated in his election as Chief of the Federation of Saskatchewan Indians, which has revolutionized Indian education in his province."

Ahenakew first came under fire in 2002 after giving a profanity-laden speech. In this speech, Ahenakew called Jewish people "a disease". Ahenakew made taped comments to the Saskatoon StarPhoenix a few days after the speech that included "That's how Hitler came in. That he was going to make damn sure that Jews weren't going to take over", and "That's why he fried six million of those guys."

In June 2003, Ahenakew was formally charged by the Saskatchewan justice department with willingly promoting hatred, but his removal from the order was put on hold until the legal dispute was finished.

On June 29, 2005, the order's Advisory Council began its formal revocation process, during a regularly scheduled semi-annual meeting. Ahenakew was informed, in writing, that he could either voluntarily resign, respond, or contest the possibility of revocation.

Ultimately, the council found that irrespective of the outcome of Ahenakew's legal proceedings, it brought disrepute to the order, and Governor General Adrienne Clarkson to issue an ordinance on July 11 to officially remove Ahenakew from the Order of Canada.

The decision to terminate Ahenakew's membership in the order was gazetted on July 30, 2005.

=== T. Sher Singh ===
T. Sher Singh received his Member of the Order of Canada in 2002, due to a record in public service. His appointment was terminated on December 10, 2008, after the Law Society of Upper Canada found him guilty of professional misconduct and revoked his licence to practise law. Among the allegations against Singh were that he failed to serve clients, mishandled trust funds, misappropriated $2,000 from a client, and continued to practise after being suspended in November 2005. His membership in the order was revoked on December 10, 2008.

=== Steve Fonyo ===
Steve Fonyo was the youngest person ever appointed as an Officer of the Order in 1985. Following his appointment, however, Fonyo developed an addiction to cocaine. The advisory council considered removing him in 1995, following a criminal conviction related to his cocaine use, but did not move to strip him from the order.

By 1996, Fonyo had a number of run-ins with the law. He was accused of a number of offences, including assault with a weapon, aggravated assault, fraud for writing bad cheques to supermarkets, and domestic violence.

Fonyo was terminated from the order on December 10, 2009. The decision to terminate Fonyo's membership in the Order was gazetted on January 23, 2010, and announced by the Governor General's office two days later.

=== Garth Drabinsky ===
Garth Drabinsky was a theatrical production mogul in Canada, responsible for numerous successful productions, most notably the long-running Toronto production of Andrew Lloyd Webber's The Phantom of the Opera. He was appointed as an Officer of the Order of Canada in 1995. In 2009, he was found guilty of fraud and forgery in Ontario and has been a fugitive from American law for related crimes. With the Supreme Court of Canada's ruling on March 29, 2012, not to hear his appeal or grant a new trial, Drabinsky has apparently exhausted his opportunities to have his convictions overturned and is serving the balance of his reduced sentence. On November 29, 2012, the Governor General signed an ordinance removing Drabinsky from the order. Drabinsky subsequently filed an application in the Federal Court of Canada to block his removal.

=== Conrad Black ===
Media baron Conrad Black was made an Officer of the Order of Canada in 1990. In 2001, following a conflict where then Prime Minister Jean Chrétien invoked the Nickle Resolution to prevent Black from being appointed a life peer, Black surrendered his Canadian citizenship, though he remained in the Order of Canada.

In 2005, Black was arrested in the United States on multiple charges of mail and wire fraud. However, due to lengthy appeals, even as Black was serving a prison sentence, he still remained a member of the Order of Canada. In September 2011, after Black returned to prison due to the failure of his appeal, Rideau Hall confirmed that Black's appointment was under review by the Advisory Council of the Order of Canada, which has the power to recommend "the termination of a person's appointment to the Order of Canada if the person has been convicted of a criminal offence." Black's requests for an oral hearing were denied by the advisory council and his application to federal court for an oral hearing to be required was dismissed. Black appealed the decision.

In an interview, Black intimated that he would rather resign from the order than be removed. "I would not wait for giving these junior officials the evidently almost aphrodisiacal pleasure of throwing me out. I would withdraw," he told CBC's Susan Ormiston. "In fact, I wouldn't be interested in serving."

On January 31, 2014, the Governor General at the time, David Johnston, announced that he had accepted a recommendation from an advisory council to remove Black from the Order of Canada. On the same day, the Governor General, acting on the recommendation of Prime Minister Stephen Harper, also expelled Black from the Queen's Privy Council for Canada, to which he had been appointed in 1992. Black, however, maintained he resigned from the order the year prior.

The decision to terminate Black's membership from the order was gazetted on February 22, 2014.

In 2019, Conrad Black's American criminal record was pardoned by President Donald Trump.

=== Ranjit Chandra ===
Ranjit Chandra was a research scientist and professor at Memorial University of Newfoundland, and was made an Officer of the Order of Canada in 1989.

In 2006, CBC aired The Secret Life of Dr. Chandra, which alleged that research published by Chandra was fraudulent.

In 2015, a jury trial in which Chandra sued the CBC for libel found the contents of the documentary to be truthful. In that same year, the British Medical Journal retracted one of his papers, "Influence of maternal diet during lactation and use of formula feeds on development of atopic eczema in high risk infants", which was published in 1989, due to what was described as "scientific misconduct".

Rideau Hall revoked Chandra's appointment to the order on December 3, 2015, and published in the Canada Gazette on January 9, 2016.

=== Johnny Issaluk ===
Johnny Issaluk is a Canadian Indigenous actor from Nunavut. He acted in films such as Indian Horse (2017) and The Terror (2018). For these and other achievements Issaluk was elevated to the Order in 2019. He was accused by Canadian Indigenous filmmaker Alethea Arnaquq-Baril of fondling her without permission at a party. While Arnaquq-Baril accepted his apology at first, over time several other women, ranging in age from 21 to 78, came forward with similar allegations. This caused the accusations to be viewed more seriously, and after allegations that Issaluk acted inappropriately during a Sedna Epic Expedition conference in Norway, there were calls for Issaluk to resign from Sedna.

Issaluk resigned from Sedna on December 9, 2019, amid questions of whether his membership in the Order would also be reconsidered. Rideau Hall at first declined to comment on Issaluk's status. By October 2022, however, Issaluk had been stripped of his membership in the Order. The reasons were said to be well founded, but Rideau Hall still declined to comment on whether it was related to the earlier allegations of Arnaquq-Baril and other women.

=== Buffy Sainte-Marie ===
Buffy Sainte-Marie is a singer-songwriter who had made being Indigenous a core theme of her work. Also known for Indigenous activism, she retired from live performances in August 2023. She was made an Officer of the Order in 1997 and promoted to Companion in 2019. Later in 2023, a CBC News investigation had revealed serious issues with Sainte-Marie's Indigenous ancestry claims, such as her alleged birth to Cree parents on the Piapot First Nation in Saskatchewan, Canada. The investigation concluded she was born in the United States and is of Italian and English descent. Her appointment to the Order of Canada was terminated by Governor general Mary Simon on January 3, 2025 and published in the Canada Gazette on February 7.

== Resignation ==
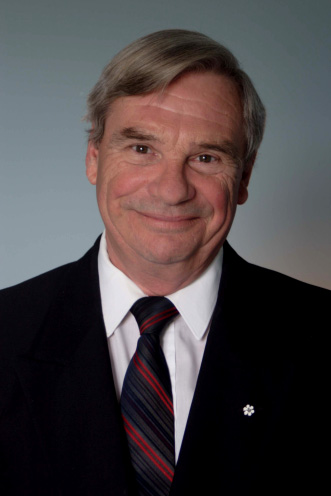
Astronomer René Racine resigned as a member of the Order in 2009. In this photo he is wearing the order's lapel pin.

Resignations from the order can take place only through the prescribed channels, which include the member submitting to the Secretary General of the Order of Canada a letter notifying the chancellery of his or her desire to terminate their membership, and only with the governor general's approval can the resignation take effect.

Members who resign must return all insignia and lose the use of the order motto, ribbon, and badge on their personal coat of arms.

=== Notable cases ===
==== Related to Henry Morgentaler ====
In reaction to the decision to induct Henry Morgentaler into the order, a number of members in the order indicated they would return or had returned their emblems in protest, including Lucien Larré and former Lieutenant Governor of New Brunswick Gilbert Finn. Larré's resignation was gazetted on May 30, 2009, having been approved on February 25, 2010. Finn never officially resigned the Order, as no news of his resignation was ever gazetted.

On June 1, 2009, the Governor General at the time, Michaëlle Jean, announced that she had accepted the resignations of astronomer and inventor René Racine, pianist Jacqueline Richard, and Cardinal Jean-Claude Turcotte. The resignations were directly attributed by media reports to the decision to induct Morgentaler. The three's resignations were gazetted on May 30, 2009, having been approved on December 9, 2008.

On April 19, 2010, the resignation of Frank Chauvin, a retired police detective who opened an orphanage in Haiti, was accepted. Chauvin's decision to resign from the order was also directly attributed by media reports to the decision to induct Morgentaler. Chauvin's resignation was gazetted on April 17, 2010, having been approved on February 25, 2010.

==== Other cases ====
In January 2013, the Governor General at the time, David Johnston, accepted the resignation of historian Camille Limoges. Limoges was named to the order in 2010, and reportedly resigned from all his honours out of a desire to live a simpler life.

At times, people resign from the order following a significant personal scandal. In July 2013, Bernard Norman Barwin's resignation from the order was approved by the Governor General, and gazetted a month later. Months prior, Barwin was reprimanded for inseminating women with the wrong sperm. It was later proven via DNA testing that Barwin had in fact inseminated numerous patients with his own sperm rather than that of the intended father or approved sperm donor without authorization of the fertility patient.

In May 2014, Louis LaPierre left the Order, after it was revealed that he misrepresented his academic credentials. Despite media reports that LaPierre was stripped of the order, and suggestions by at least one member of the order that LaPierre be stripped of the honour, the text used in the Canada Gazette notice on his leaving of the order, published in June 2014, were similar to those used in other resignations, and clearly states that the individual requested the removal.

In autumn of 2023, former judge and academic Mary Ellen Turpel-Lafond left the Order after it was revealed that she had misrepresented Cree ancestry. Turpel-Lafond had previously been stripped of several other awards and honorary degrees, although as with LaPierre the Order officially recorded the termination of Turpel-Lafond's membership as being at her own request.

== Death ==
The Constitution for the Order of Canada also allows for membership in the order to end when a member dies. When a member dies, the post-nominal letters may still be affixed to their name and their family may keep the insignia as family heirlooms.

Organizations such as the Missionary Oblates of Mary Immaculate and Madonna House Apostolate have, on at least one occasion, returned Order of Canada insignias of deceased former members. However, since membership terminates with the death of the member, the return of the insignia has no effect on the composition of the order.

== Change in status ==
The first person "removed" from the order was considered by historian Christopher McCreery as more of a transfer of status than a removal.

In 1981, Zena Sheardown was appointed an honorary member of the Order of Canada. She was the wife of John Sheardown, a staff member at the Canadian embassy in Tehran during the Iranian Revolution. At this time, the new regime did not recognize international laws regarding diplomatic immunity and allowed a group of students to take control of the US embassy and hold its staff members hostage. Several staff were not on site at this time and found refuge with the Canadian diplomatic contingent, the now famous Canadian Caper. At great personal risk, the Sheardowns personally housed four Americans in their home for months until they could be safely removed from the country. At this point, although married to a Canadian, Zena was awarded an honorary Order of Canada in 1981, due to her being a British subject via her Guyanese citizenship.

By 1986, Sheardown had become a naturalized Canadian, and Sheardown's honorary appointment was terminated, in exchange for an appointment as a full member.

== Bibliography ==
- McCreery, Christopher (2005). The Order of Canada: Its Origins, History, and Development. University of Toronto Press. p. 213. ISBN 978-0-8020-3940-8.
