= Cerveau House =

Building in St. Augustine, Florida, US

Coordinates: 29.8960°N 81.3126°W

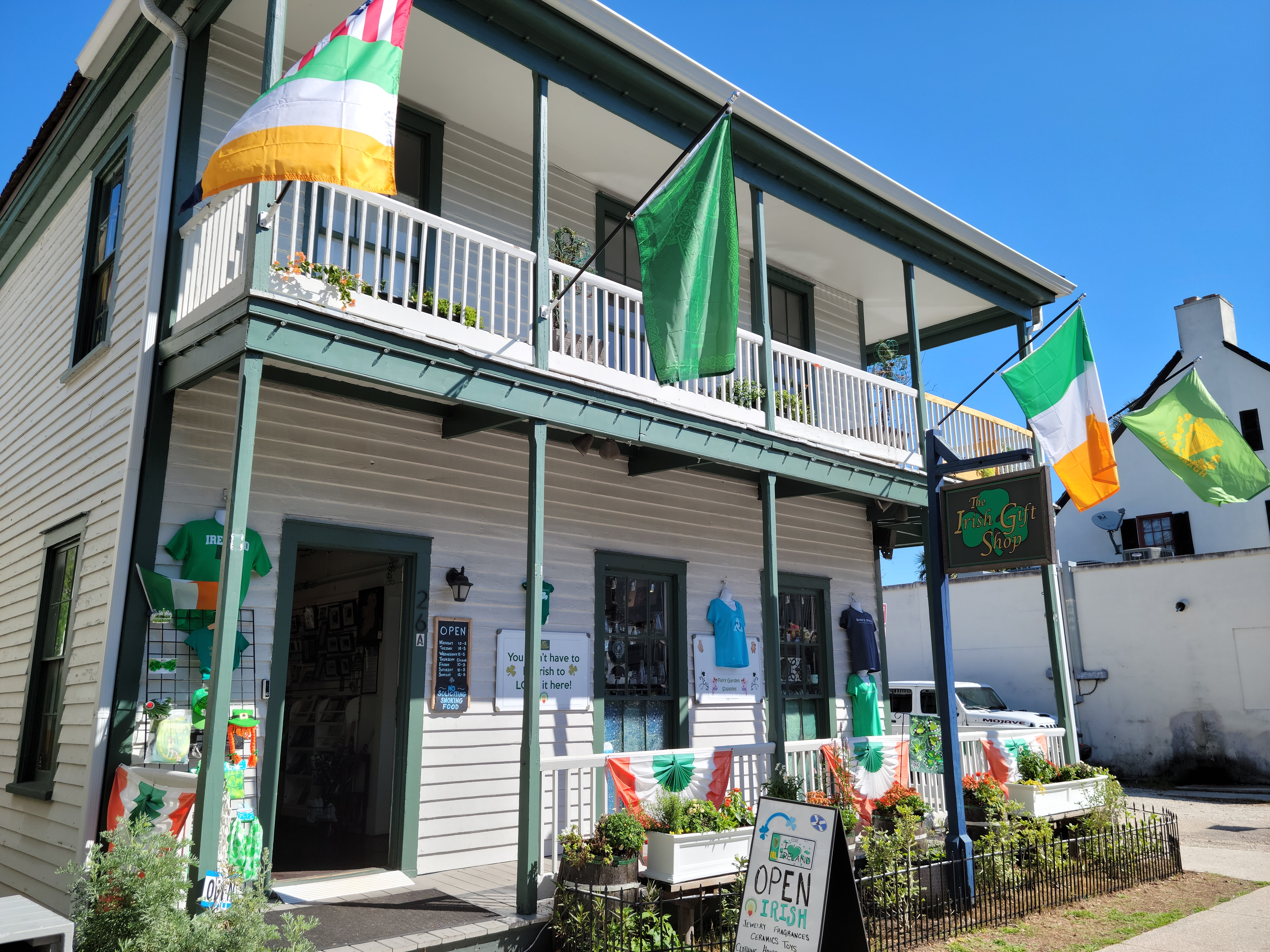
- Interactive map of the Cerveau House area

General information
- Location: 26 Cuna Street, St. Augustine, Florida, U.S.

The Cerveau House is located at 26 Cuna Street in St. Augustine, Florida. It is an original house, constructed in the 19th century.

== History ==
In a 1764 Spanish map, the lot where the Cerveau House would come to stand was described as being vacant. A map from the following year described the lot as belonging to Jesse Fish, a British agent. Most likely there was no building on the site until the later stages of St. Augustine's British Period. A 1788 map shows the existence of a timber frame house in poor condition.

From the town's inventory and assessment of property taken in 1790, we learn that at 26 Cuna Street stood, “a wooden house covered with palm belonging to Jose Buchany on the King’s lot.” Jose Buchany had borrowed money from a Miguel Segui and in 1803, the Spanish government bestowed the title of the house to Segui's heirs since Buchany had failed to pay his mortgage.

The last owner of the house before it was purchased by preservation organizations was a Blanche Cerveau.

== Preservation ==
The St. Augustine Historical Restoration and Preservation Commission purchased the Cerveau House for $19,000 in 1966. Director of the Board Earle Newton stated that the main use for the Cerveau House at the time of sale was that it could be used as a rental property and that it would provide access to another Board-owned property at the rear of the Spanish Inn. In the following years the space was occupied by a retail store known as the "straw market." Although the Cerveau House was a nice example of Victorian architecture, built after the Civil War, Newton wanted to make it look more "Spanish Colonial," and replaced the ornate jigsawn balustrade on the wraparound porch (which looked out towards Matanzas Bay) with something simpler. The building has never been advertised as having a significant history of its own, since it is of Victorian rather than colonial origin.

== Present day ==
Today the Cerveau House is owned by the state of Florida and managed on its behalf by University of Florida Historic St. Augustine, Inc. It is used as retail space, operated by the Irish Gift Shop.
