= Jonah Ogunniyi Otunla =

Nigerian financial accountant (1955–2024)

Accountant General of the Federation
- In office 28 June 2011 – 12 June 2015
- Succeeded by: Ahmed Idris

Personal details
- Born: 12 June 1955 Present-day Oyo State, Federation of Nigeria
- Died: 17 June 2024 (aged 69)

Jonah Ogunniyi Otunla OFR (12 June 1955 – 17 June 2024) was a Nigerian financial accountant who served as Accountant General of the Federation of Nigeria. He also served as board members of the Central Bank of Nigeria. Otunla died on 17 June 2024, at the age of 69.

== Education ==
Otunla was born on 12 June 1955, in what is now Oyo State, in southwestern Nigeria. He had his secondary education at Baptist High School, Saki where he obtained the West African School Certificate in 1972 before he proceeded to Obafemi Awolowo University where he received a bachelor's degree in Financial accounting. He became a chartered accountant in 1986 but received the fellowship of Institute of Chartered Accountants of Nigeria in 1998.

== Career ==
Otunla began his career in August 1980 with Unilever as accountant. He left the organization in 1989, to join the Oyo State civil service as Chief Internal Auditor, the same year he became the Director of Finance. In June 1989, he was appointed Accountant General the State, a position he held until March 2004 when he got a transfer to the Office of the Accountant General of the Federation. On 28 June 2011, he was appointed the Accountant General of the Federation by Goodluck Ebele Jonathan, the former President of Nigeria. On 12 June 2015, Otunla retired honourably from the Civil Service after attaining the mandatory age of 60 years.
