= Graceland University =

Private university in Iowa and Missouri, US

- Former name: Graceland College (1895–2000)
- Motto: Prudens futuri (Wisdom for the Future)
- Type: Private university
- Established: 1895; 131 years ago
- Religious affiliation: Community of Christ
- Endowment: $52.5 million
- President: Joel Shrock
- Faculty: 120 (fall 2022)
- Students: 1,102 (Fall 2024)
- Undergraduates: 798 (fall 2024)
- Postgraduates: 304 (fall 2024)
- Location: Lamoni, Iowa, U.S. 40°36′58″N 93°55′33″W
- Campus: Rural, 170 acres (69 ha)
- Colors: Blue & Gold
- Nickname: Yellowjackets
- Sporting affiliations: NAIA – HAAC
- Mascot: Sting
- Website: graceland.edu
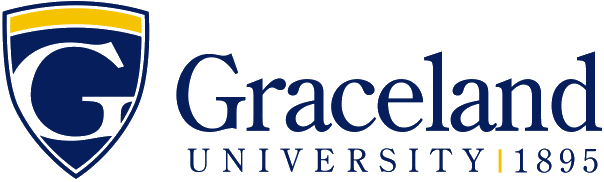

Graceland University is a private university with campuses in Lamoni, Iowa, and Independence, Missouri, United States. The university offers degree completion and master's degree programs. It also offers undergraduate and graduate programs online. The university was founded in 1895. Graceland was established by, and is affiliated with, Community of Christ, formerly the Reorganized Church of Jesus Christ of Latter Day Saints (RLDS Church).

Graceland's main campus in Lamoni offers over 50 academic programs, including 9 preprofessional programs and 35 undergraduate majors. The residential campus also offers 18 varsity sports, campus-wide activities, and intramural sports.

The Independence campus offers graduate and undergraduate programs in the School of Nursing and the Edmund J. Gleazer School of Education. The campus is also home to programs in the Community of Christ Seminary.

== History ==
Graceland University was established as Graceland College in 1895 by the RLDS Church (later Community of Christ) in Lamoni, Iowa. Land for the college was donated by church members, with the first 20 acres (8.1 ha) given by Marietta Walker. The name "Graceland" was selected by Colonel George Barrett, land surveyor for the college, for the graceful slope of the hill upon which it was built. Until the administration building was completed, classes were conducted in a building in downtown Lamoni. The first day of classes was September 17, 1895.

In 1917, Graceland received accreditation from the states of Iowa and Missouri and from the North Central Association of Colleges, making it the first fully accredited junior college in Iowa. Graceland became a four-year college in 1960. Its nursing program began in 1910 as a cooperative program with the Independence Sanitarium and Hospital in Independence, Missouri. The Graceland campus was extended to Independence with the establishment of the college's bachelor's degree program in 1968–69.

The Graceland Partnership Program, offering degree-completion programs on community college campuses, was established in 1989. In 1995, Graceland acquired SkillPath, a business training company that offers seminars and classes. Graceland College became Graceland University on June 1, 2000.

Patricia Draves was Graceland's president from June 15, 2017 until she resigned in 2024 to become president of Monmouth College. Joel Shrock acted as interim president from summer 2024 until Graceland formally inaugurated him as president on November 2, 2024.

== Academics ==
=== Reputation ===
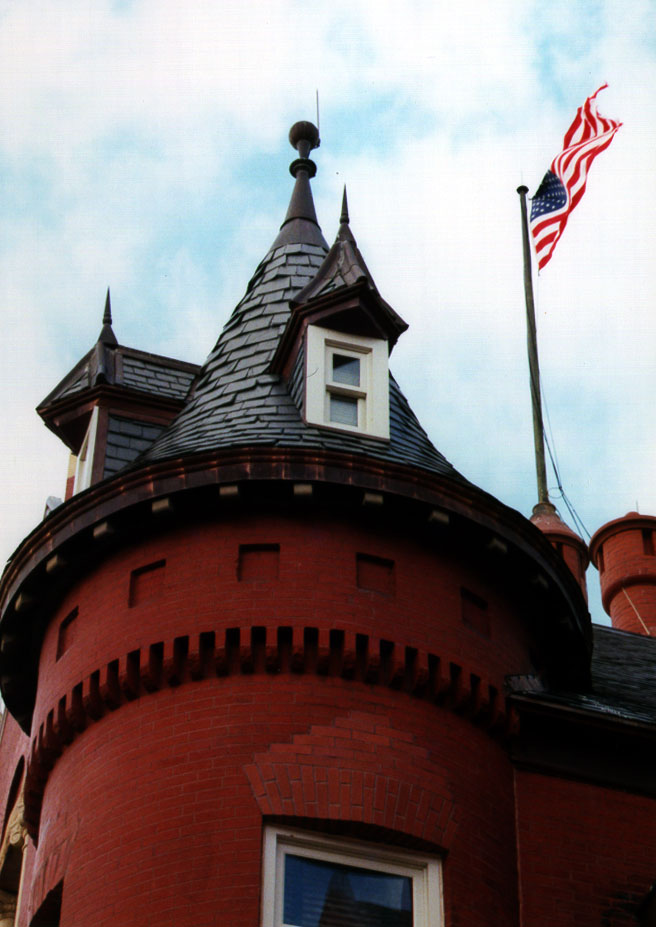
Graceland Administration building

Graceland ranked "first tier" in U.S. News & World Report's "America's Best Colleges" in 2011, 2012 and 2013. It falls in the "Private University" category, "Midwest Region". In 2012, Graceland ranked 91st and in 2013 88th. The reports cite Graceland's small class sizes, with 72% of classes containing 20 or fewer students, financial aid services, and the university's "selective" admissions process. Graceland has also been recognized by the Princeton Review as a top school in the Midwest.

=== Accreditation ===
Graceland is accredited by the Higher Learning Commission. The teacher education programs are accredited by the Council for the Accreditation of Educator Preparation. The nursing programs are accredited by the Commission on Collegiate Nursing Education and have full approval status with the Iowa Board of Nursing and the Missouri State Board of Nursing.

=== Programs ===
==== College of Liberal Arts and Sciences ====
Graceland's College of Liberal Arts and Science holds classes only on the Lamoni campus. The college holds five divisions: Division of Visual and Performing Arts, Division of Health and Movement Science, Division of Humanities, Division of Science and Math and the Division of Social Science. Among these divisions are over 30 majors, including pre-professional programs.

==== School of Nursing ====
The School of Nursing is one of Graceland's most popular programs. The School of Nursing offers classes on the Independence Campus and online. In the undergraduate nursing program (Bachelor of Science in Nursing (BSN) to Registered Nurse), students complete four semesters of general education classes on the Lamoni campus, then transfer to the Independence campus to complete their final four semesters. An accelerated nursing program is available that allows students to graduate is seven semesters.

The School of Nursing's online programs include both graduate and undergraduate degrees: BA in health care management, RN to BSN, RN to MSN, Master of Nursing, Family Nurse Practitioner Post Master MSN certificate, Nurse Educator Post Master MSN certificate and a Doctor of Nursing Practice.

==== Edmund J. Gleazer School of Education ====
The Edmund J. Gleazer School of Education, named for Edmund John Gleazer Jr., a past president of the university, is one of Graceland's largest programs. The school offers both undergraduate and graduate programs. Classes are offered on the Lamoni campus, Independence campus, the regional campuses and online.

Undergraduate degrees include elementary education and secondary education. The Lamoni campus is the only location that offers a secondary teaching certificate. The School of Education has a partnership with Kansas City, MO, schools, called Professional Development Schools (PDS). The PDS partnership assigns education students to an in-the-field classroom for an entire semester of student teaching (as opposed to the traditional one semester.)

The School of Education offers international programs, where students can student-teach in New Zealand, or take winter term classes in Jamaica and Zambia.

Graduate programs include a Master's of Education with six different specializations: literacy instruction, management in the inclusive classroom, collaborative teaching and learning, differentiated instruction, technology integration and mild/moderate special education.

==== C.H. Sandage School of Business ====
The C.H. Sandage School of Business offers undergraduate programs. Classes are held on the Lamoni campus and degree completion programs are held online and at regional campuses. Programs include accounting, agricultural business, business administration, economics, organizational leadership and sport management.

The School of Business maintains a close partnership with the John C. Whitehead School of Diplomacy and International Relations at Seton Hall University. Graceland students who plan to attend a graduate school are encouraged to consider Seton Hall as an option. The School of Business is named after Charles H. Sandage, a past professor for the university.

===== Enactus =====
The School of Business is tied to Graceland's Enactus team. Founded in 1989, the team works internationally and locally. In recent years, Graceland Enactus program has taken winter term trips to Zambia, the Philippines and Belize. In 1996 Graceland Enactus was named U.S. National Champion, and advanced to compete at the Enactus World Cup in Paris, France. The team finished second to China at the competition. In April 2012, Graceland Enactus was named Regional Champion for the 12th consecutive year and placed in the top eight teams at the Enactus National Exposition.

==== Community of Christ Seminary ====
The Community of Christ Seminary is offered online or at the Community of Christ Temple. The program offers a Master's of Arts in religion.

== Chapel ==
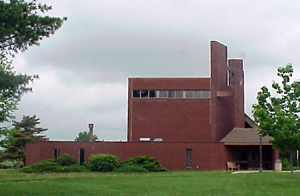
Roy A. Cheville Chapel at Graceland University, Lamoni, Iowa, dedicated 1978

The Cheville Chapel was dedicated in 1978 in honor of Roy Cheville, theologian, educator and former Presiding Patriarch of the Community of Christ. The structure was built for $325,000 and funded by a restricted private bequest. In keeping with the desire for the chapel to be an accessible place of solitude, Graceland's president Frank Hough determined that the facility should remain unstaffed and open at all times.

The chapel's relatively small seating capacity makes it an intimate setting for worship, theological education and the performance of sacred music. Known for its excellent acoustics, it has been used for small ensemble performances. It is used several times a week by campus groups for worship services, and as a place of individual prayer and reflection.

Architecturally, the postmodern brick structure is minimalist. It is reminiscent of the exterior simplicity of the Rothko Chapel in Houston built only a few years earlier, while its twin steeple foreshadows the deconstructivist style in architecture that began a decade later. The chapel houses Aaron Sherer's "The Process of Becoming", a canvas wall hanging employing a mix of colorfully painted ribbons.

== Student life ==
=== Residence life ===
Instead of having fraternities and sororities like many universities, Graceland has residential social organizations called "Houses." These Houses are on Graceland's main campus, but the Independence campus has its own House, McKevit Manor. Students are assigned to a House whether they live on or off campus. Graceland has eight men's Houses: Agape, Cheville, Closson, Faunce, Orion, Powell, Stewart Manor, and Tiona; and eight women's Houses: Amici, Aponivi, Hanthorne, Khiyah, Paloma, Sariah, Shalom, and Solah.

Each House has officers who serve on Graceland's student government. The officers form a House Council, including a House President (who leads the House Council), a Campus Organization of Social Activities (COSA) representative, an Academic Student Council (ASC) representative, a senator, an intramural sports representative and a chaplain. House Council members are elected by members of their House. In addition to their student government duties, House Council members plan social activities called "functions". The functions vary by House and range from formal dinners to campouts.

Houses hold meetings every Tuesday at 10 p.m. Meetings are led by the House President and House Council and vary widely from House to House.

=== Activities and organizations ===
Graceland has over 50 clubs and organizations for students. Between Graceland student government and the campus clubs and organizations, over 250 official leadership positions are available.

Graceland student government programs are a popular student activity, particularly for sophomore and junior students on campus.

Intramural sports are one of the most popular campus activities, with over 47% student participation. Intramural teams are divided by House and level of competition.

Other popular student clubs include the Association for Computing Machinery (ACM), International Club, Community Development Club, Enactus, Outdoor Club, Sustainability Club, Investment Club and the popular Lettuce Club, which meets once a year to have a lettuce eating competition, and the winner becomes the president for the next year.

=== Performing arts ===
With the completion of the Shaw Center expansion in fall 2012, Graceland has placed a renewed emphasis on the performing arts. Graceland performance groups include Chamber Singers, Concert Choir, Oratorio Chorus, Jazz Band, Pep Band, Symphonic Band, Orchestra and Theatre. For the 2012–2013 academic year, Graceland doubled its number of annual theatre productions. Over 1/3 of Graceland students participate in the arts (both visual and performing).

Graceland brings a variety of talent acts to campus. In 2012, Graceland brought in Canadian trumpeter Jens Lindemann, trombone player Wycliffe Gordon, the Fountain City Brass Band, vocalist Shannon Gaye, actor Arliss Howard, who directed Graceland's homecoming play, the Vienna Boys Choir, and Owen/Cox Dance group.

=== School traditions ===
==== House Meeting ====
Every Tuesday at 10:00 p.m. students gather with their fellow House members in a weekly meeting. Meetings are led by the House President and involve House Council members. Meetings vary from House to House, but generally include recreational activities and announcements from House Council members. Meetings are generally held in House lounges.

==== Air Band ====
Every year at Graceland's annual Homecoming weekend, COSA puts on an Air Band competition. Male Houses are paired with female Houses (brother/sister Houses) and teams compete against each other in a choreographed dance competition. Houses spend weeks preparing props, themes, and storylines for the competition, then perform their routines before a panel of judges. The winner of Air Band is awarded points, and the team with the most Homecoming points wins money for its House.

==== New Years in November ====
Every year in mid-November, COSA sponsors a campuswide dance and celebration, called New Year's in November. The event is essentially a celebration of the coming new year, because students are not on campus for New Year's Eve. The event has a specific theme every year and includes dancing and other activities. The event traditionally ends with a pancake breakfast in the Commons (dining hall).

==== Final Fling ====
On the final weekend of the semester, COSA sponsors a campuswide celebration for students. Events vary year to year, but often include inflatables, sports tournaments, and various entertainment acts. Students collect wristbands for each event they attend, and at the weekend's conclusion enter their wristbands in a drawing for prizes.

==== Thursday Night Movie ====
Once a week, COSA plays a free movie in the local theatre, The Coliseum. Before 2012, the movie played on Wednesdays; the day was changed in fall 2012 to accommodate Graceland student government meetings.

== Athletics ==
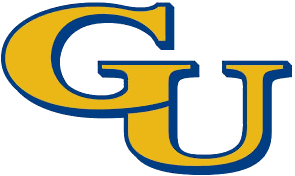
Graceland athletics monogram

The Graceland athletic teams are called the Yellowjackets. The university is a member of the National Association of Intercollegiate Athletics (NAIA), primarily competing in the Heart of America Athletic Conference (HAAC) since the 1971–72 academic year. The Yellowjackets previously competed in the Missouri College Athletic Union (MCAU) from 1960–61 to 1970–71.

Graceland competes in 22 intercollegiate varsity sports. Men's sports include baseball, basketball, cross country, football, golf, soccer, track & field (indoor and outdoor), volleyball and wrestling; women's sports include basketball, cross country, flag football, golf, soccer, softball, track & field (indoor and outdoor) and volleyball; and co-ed sports include cheerleading, dance and rodeo.

== Alumni ==
- Alik L. Alik: politician, Vice President of the Federated States of Micronesia, 2007–2015
- Leonard Boswell: politician, Democratic member of the United States House of Representatives, Iowa 3rd District, 1997–2013
- Teresa Carpenter: journalist and novelist, Pulitzer Prize winner, 1981
- David Clinefelter: American teacher and academic administrator, 1972
- David Dancer: American politician
- Roxie Dean: country music singer-songwriter
- Merle Harmon: sport announcer, motivational speaker, entrepreneur
- Caitlyn Jenner (formerly Bruce Jenner): 1976 Olympic gold medalist- decathlon, television personality
- Chad Elliott: American folk singer-songwriter and artist
- Don Knabe: former member of Los Angeles County Board of Supervisors
- Roger D. Launius: author, US Air Force historian, NASA chief historian, associate director, Smithsonian National Air and Space Museum
- C. Robert Mesle: process theologian, 1972
- Frederick Madison Smith: Graceland's first graduate; third president of the Reorganized Church of Jesus Christ of Latter Day Saints 1915–1946, (Community of Christ)
- Israel Alexander Smith: president of the Reorganized Church of Jesus Christ of Latter Day Saints 1946–1958, (Community of Christ)
- Lee Edward Travis: psychologist and speech pathologist
- David Yost: actor, original Blue Power Ranger
- Milton Young: politician, Republican U.S. Senator from North Dakota, 1945–1981
