= Robert Levasseur =

Robert Levasseur may refer to:

- Robert Levasseur (rugby union) (1898–1974), French rugby union player
- Robert Levasseur (management scholar), American academic
