= Sikhchic.com =

Sikh online magazine

sikhchic
- Website type: Online magazine
- Available in: English
- Founded: 2006
- Country of origin: Canada
- Key people: Tapishar Sher Singh (founder)
- Website: sikhchic.com

sikhchic.com is a Sikh online magazine covering Sikh culture, art, and humour. It is one of the leading online magazines for Sikhs.

== Description ==
Sikhchic has been described by scholar Susan E. Prill as serving educated, diasporic Sikhs, most of whom have not been formally initiated into the Khalsa order. Jacob Copeman describes the website as being "popular in the diaspora, particularly amongst young Sikhs". The focus of the website is primarily on Sikhs in public culture and Sikh art. sikhchic hosted a satirical cartoon called Sikh Park on its site. Furthermore, the site contains column sections on various aspects of Punjabi Sikh culture. Sikh history-related topics are also covered by the magazine. Sikhs in films, artwork created by Sikhs, and Sikh-designed fashion, are further topics of interest. The website also provided detailed discussion on Punjabi cuisine, music, and humour.

The mission statement of sikhchic is as follows:

The definition of "Sikh", for the purposes of our magazine, is unabashedly a broad one, which includes any and all who are of Sikh origin and/or consider themselves Sikh. We do not attempt to judge others as to who is a good Sikh and who isn't, or who falls in or out of any particular definition.

— SikhChic editorial team, From The Editor's Desk ... (3 July 2007 )

Sikhchic attempts to avoid content that delves too deeply into politics, religion, and news as there already exists a plethora of websites covering those topics. Sikhchic claims to not shy away from controversial or difficult topics, and publishes in the spirit of chardi kala, but they do avoid divisive issues. The editors believe in an open and tolerant attitude towards defining who is a Sikh and that Sikh culture should be given free-rein to develop on its own, not suppressed. The website therefore highlights any Sikhs who have been successful in Western and Indian pop-culture and society.

== History ==
Tapishar Sher Singh conceived of a media outlet serving Sikh interests and aspirations. Whilst growing up in India, he often heard his fellow Sikhs discussing how the most dire need for the Sikh community is media that represents them. He cites two newspapers: The Tribune and Hindustan Times, as being originally founded by a Sikh with the community's funds, having their vision in-mind, but are no longer controlled by Sikhs. He further claimed that existing Sikh media periodicals, such as The Khalsa Samachar, The Sant-Sipahi, The Sikh Review, and Nishaan, do not have the reach needed to bring the wider Sikh community together. He envisioned that with the coming of the Internet age, the low population of Sikhs and their minority status was no longer a valid reason for their voice to be looked-over, as anyone can publish on the Internet.

Sikhchic was launched in 2006. The site primarily relied on word-of-mouth for its growth.

== People involved ==
=== Internal team ===
- Tapishar Sher Singh – founder and volunteer
- Neha Singh Gohil – lawyer and journalist
- Manjyot Kaur – conservation librarian and reader
- Meeta Kaur – creative writer
- Nicola Mooney – researcher, instructor, and anthropology professor
- The Singh Twins (Amrit Singh and Rabindra Kaur Singh) – artists, writers, and filmmakers
- Dalbir Singh – adman, designer, and creator
- Henna Kaur Singh – literary scholar
- I. J. Singh – writer and speaker
- Khushwant Singh – author (Note: Khushwant Singh should not be confused with his famous namesake.)
- Manpreet Kaur Singh – journalist, radio host, magazine columnist, and website manager
- Nikky-Guninder Kaur Singh – author and scholar

=== Patrons ===
- Birinder Singh Ahluwalia – entrepreneur

=== Sponsors ===
- Munshi Bishan Singh Kochhar Foundation (MBSK Foundation) – located in New York, U.S.A.
