= David Clinefelter =

President of Graceland University
- In office 1997–2002
- Preceded by: William T. Higdon
- Succeeded by: John K. Menzies

Personal details
- Born: David Lee Clinefelter; August 22, 1950 (age 76) Sharon, Pennsylvania, U.S.
- Education: Graceland College; Ohio State University
- Occupation: Teacher, academic administrator

David Lee Clinefelter (born August 22, 1950) is an American teacher and academic administrator who served as president of Graceland University. He is dean of student affairs at the University of the People. Clinefelter was previously superintendent of Lamoni Community School District, provost of Kaplan University, and chief academic officer of Walden University.

== Early life and education ==
Clinefelter was born on August 22, 1950, in Sharon, Pennsylvania.

Clinefelter graduated from Graceland College in 1972. He completed a M.A. (1976) and Ph.D. (1978) at Ohio State University. His dissertation was titled Analysis of the interaction between students, teachers, and materials in intermediate grade mathematics classes. Clinefelter's doctoral advisor was Jack Frymier.

== Career ==
Clinefelter was a high school teacher and principal. In 1989, he was the superintendent of Lamoni Community School District. Clinefelter was a professor at the University of Nebraska Omaha.

Clinefelter was vice president for academic affairs at Graceland College for six years. In 1996, he took a sabbatical to conduct a fellowship with the American Council on Education at Northwest Missouri State University. In 1997, Clinefelter succeeded William T. Higdon as president of Graceland College. He served as president for six years. Clinefelter was succeeded by John K. Menzies. In 2002, he became provost of Kaplan University. Clinefelter became the chief academic officer at Walden University in 2010. In 2011, he joined the Learninghouse, Inc. as their chief academic officer. He retired in 2017.

Clinefelter is dean of student affairs at the University of the People.
