= Community of Christ Seminary =

Seminary in Missouri, United States

Coordinates: 39°05′38″N 94°26′01″W

The Community of Christ Seminary at the Independence campus of Graceland University is the official and only seminary of Community of Christ. It offers two graduate degrees: a Master of Arts in Religion and a Master of Art in Peace and Social Transformation. The current dean is Zac Harmon-McLaughlin.

Designed for bi-vocational and professional ministers, Graceland’s Master of Arts in Religion is a 34 semester hour graduate program with three different concentrations in Christian Theology, Spiritual Leadership, Peace and Justice. All three of these concentrations provide a unique blend of religious theory and practical studies with a strong focus on biblical studies, Christian history and theology, leadership, peace and justice.

The Master of Arts in Peace and Social Transformation is a 34 semester hour graduate program that aims to develop personal and moral integrity for students, which is essential in the public work of peace and justice. By pairing foundational theological and scriptural courses with formational, contextual, and practical academic studies, students can deepen their experience and understanding of peace, social change, and justice work

The Seminary recently launched a collaborative partnership with Graceland University and Community of Christ called the Center for Innovation in Ministry and Mission (CIMM). CIMM offers non-credit bearing continuing education units (CEU’s) that focus on priesthood development, leadership development, and theological education. These CEU’s do not lead to a degree.
