= Assisted Human Reproduction Canada =

Canadian federal regulatory agency

Assisted Human Reproduction Canada (AHRC) was a federal regulatory agency that was established in 2006 to protect and promote the health, safety, dignity and rights of Canadians who use or are born of assisted human reproduction technologies. AHRC was created to administer the 2004 Assisted Human Reproduction Act, including gathering information about reproductive technologies and related issues, and disseminating this information to the Ministry of Health, to interested organizations, and to members of the public. AHRC was also tasked with fostering an environment in which ethical principles are applied in all matters related to assisted human reproduction, while supporting scientific advances that benefit Canadians. The agency was led by a president and governed by a board of directors.

== History ==
In 1989, Prime Minister Brian Mulroney founded the Royal Commission on New Reproductive Technologies. Commissioners spent four years examining assisted human reproduction (AHR) activities in Canada. They heard from 40,000 Canadians, including doctors, medical organizations, patients and other interested parties, before issuing their final report, "Proceed with Care," in 1993. The report called on the Government of Canada to ban activities such as payment for sperm or eggs, commercial surrogacy and human cloning. It also recommended the establishment of an independent regulatory body to govern permissible AHR activities.

On March 29, 2004, Bill C-6, the Assisted Human Reproduction Act received Royal Assent and became law. Provisions of the Act come into force on the day fixed by order of the Governor in Council. The provisions relating to the prohibitions (sections 5 to 9) and the controlled activities remain in force (except for section 12 relating to reimbursement of AHR related expenditures.)

Assisted Human Reproduction Canada was established on January 12, 2006 to administer the Assisted Human Reproduction Act. On December 21, 2006, the Minister of Health announced the appointment. by the Governor in Council. of a President, a Chairperson and members of the board of directors. The President took office on February 14, 2007.

The final head of the agency was President Dr. Elinor Wilson, who served from February 14, 2007 until September 30, 2012.

In 2010, in response to an appeal from the Quebec Court of Appeal, the Supreme Court of Canada made a ruling that significantly reduced the federal role in assisted human reproduction.

On March 29, 2012, during the federal budget announcement, it was announced that Assisted Human Reproduction Canada would be closed. Its responsibilities were transferred to Health Canada, with the final closure of operations by March 31, 2013. The government's intention was to streamline federal functions related to assisted human reproduction and to save money.

== Roles and responsibilities ==
AHRC's mandate and responsibilities were set out in the Assisted Human Reproduction Act. The Agency's essential functions included:

- Issuing and reviewing licences under the AHR Act
- Carrying out inspections and enforcement related to activities prohibited or controlled under the AHR Act
- Collecting, analysing and managing health reporting information relating to controlled activities
- Providing information to the public and professions on AHR and other matters under the Act, including risk factors associated with infertility
- Providing advice to the Minister of Health on issues relating to assisted human reproduction
- Monitoring and evaluating scientific and clinical developments within Canada and internationally on AHR and other matters to which the Act applies
- Consulting persons and organizations within Canada and internationally
- Maintaining relationships with international bodies with an interest in the quality, safety and ethical practices of fertility procedures.

== Governance ==
Assisted Human Reproduction Canada was established as a Departmental Corporation (Schedule II under the Financial Administration Act) and reported to Parliament through the Minister of Health. AHRC was governed by a board of directors of up to 13 members, including the chairperson and the president, which legally had to meet at least twice each year. Board members were appointed by the Governor in Council. The board was expected to provide advice to the Minister of Health on matters related to assisted human reproduction, to oversee and approve the organization's goals, operational policies and budget, and to evaluate AHRC's performance.

== See also ==
- Human Fertilisation and Embryology Authority of the United Kingdom
