= Elinor Wilson =

Dr. Elinor Wilson R.N.

President of Assisted Human Reproduction Canada
- In office February 14, 2007 – September 30, 2012 (during the pleasure of the Governor General)
- Preceded by: agency established

Elinor Wilson is a Canadian nurse, who was the president of Assisted Human Reproduction Canada, between February 14, 2007, and September 30, 2012.

== Education ==
Wilson has a Master of Health Sciences degree from McMaster University, and PhD in administration management from Walden University in Minneapolis, Minnesota.

== Career ==
In December 2006, Wilson was appointed president of Assisted Human Reproduction Canada (AHRC). The agency is a regulatory agency of the Government of Canada, established by an Act of Parliament. As president, she was responsible for providing strategic leadership, managing the day-to-day activities of the agency, developing corporate strategies and performance measurements, promoting excellence and networking and providing sound and informed advice in a sensitive domain.

Before her appointment with AHRC, Wilson was chief executive officer of the Canadian Public Health Association, responsible for managing an operating program and project budget in excess of $15 million, and for building relationships with stakeholders, members, partners and donors across the public, private and NGO sectors. Wilson has also held a number of increasingly responsible positions with the Heart and Stroke Foundation of Canada.

Her professional activities are numerous, including past-member of the Institute of Population and Public Health Advisory Board at the Canadian Institutes of Health Research, and the Canadian Population Health Initiative Board. She was formerly vice president of the World Heart Federation, president of the InterAmerican Heart Federation, and a member of the World Health Organization (WHO) Expert Advisory Group on Global Cessation Policy. During the WHO deliberations on the Framework Convention on Tobacco Control (FCTC) she was the NGO representative on the Canadian Government delegation to the FCTC.
