= International Journal of Applied Management and Technology =

The International Journal of Applied Management and Technology (IJAMT) is an international peer-reviewed journal in the fields of applied management and applied technology. The journal is sponsored by The School of Management at Walden University. It has listed its goals as:

- Encourage collaborative and multi-disciplinary examinations of important issues in business and technology management.
- Engage scholars and scholar-practitioners in a dynamic and important dialogue.
- Contribute original knowledge and expand understanding in the fields of:
  - Applied management
  - Decision sciences
  - Information Systems management
  - Knowledge and learning management
  - Emerging technologies
  - Project management
  - Business process improvement
  - e-Business strategies
  - Operations research
  - Leadership and organizational change
  - Public and non-profit administration
  - Public Policy

IJAMT is published biannually, in May and November, and is available online.
