= Jacob Lozada =

Puerto Rican politician

Assistant Secretary of the United States Department of Veterans Affairs for Human Resources and Administration
- In office 2001–2003
- President: George W. Bush
- Preceded by: Eugene A. Brickhouse
- Succeeded by: Robert Allen Pittman

United States Office of Personnel Management Special Advisor to the Director of OPM for Diversity Strategy
- In office 2003–2008
- President: George W. Bush

Personal details
- Born: July 24, 1944 (age 82) San Lorenzo, Puerto Rico
- Party: Republican
- Education: University of Puerto Rico (BS); Baylor University (MHA); Walden University (Ph.D.)

Military service
- Allegiance: United States of America
- Branch/service: United States Army
- Years of service: 1966–1993
- Rank: Colonel
- Awards: Legion of Merit; Defense Meritorious Service Medal; Meritorious Service Medal (6)

Dr. Jacob (Jake) Lozada was nominated by U.S. Office of Personnel Management Director to serve as the Human Resource Agency's special advisor to the Director of OPM for Diversity Strategy. He was nominated by President George W. Bush as the Assistant Secretary of the United States Department of Veterans Affairs. Formerly a management consultant with Electronic Data Systems (EDS) in Herndon, Virginia. He is a 27-year veteran of the United States Army, holds a Bachelor of Science from the University of Puerto Rico, and received a Master of Health Administration from Baylor University, and a Ph.D. from Walden University.

== Brief biography ==
Lozada was commissioned a United States Army second lieutenant through the Army Reserve Officers' Training Corps (ROTC) Program from the University of Puerto Rico. He served in the United States Army Medical Corps for 25 years, attaining the rank of colonel.

On April 30, 2001, President George W. Bush nominated him to be Assistant Secretary of Veterans Affairs.

On February 28, 2003, nominated by United States Office of Personnel Management Director to serve as the Human Resource Agency's special advisor to the Director of OPM for Diversity Strategy.

== Military career ==
Lozada held several commands in his 26 years in the Army, such commander of the Rodriguez Army Health Clinic at Fort Buchanan, Puerto Rico, from 1974 to 1977, assistant I.G. Health Services Command, Fort Sam Houston, Texas, 1980 to 1983. commander, 8th Evac. Hosp, Fort Ord, California, 1983 to 1985. chief, Force Structure, Health Services Command, Fort Sam Houston, Texas, 1986 to 1989, deputy commander admin., 121st Evac. Hospital, Yongsan Garrison, Seoul, Korea, 1989 to 1991, director C4, Joint Multinational Training Command (JMRTC), 1990–91, deputy chief of operations, Army Medical Research Development Command (USAMRDC), 1991 to 1993 in Fort Detrick, Maryland. Lozada retired from the United States Army in 1993.

Badge	Expert Field Medical Badge		
1	Legion of Merit		
2	Defense Meritorious Service Medal	Meritorious Service Medal with six bronze oak leaf clusters	Army Commendation Medal with one silver oak leaf cluster
3	Armed Forces Expeditionary Medal	National Defense Service Medal	Armed Forces Reserve Medal

== Education ==
- BA, University of Puerto Rico, PR, 1966
- MHA, Baylor University, Waco, TX, 1979
- PhD, Walden University, 1995

== Professional memberships and associations ==
Interamerican College of Physicians and Surgeons National Hispanic Youth Initiative, Former National Board Member for AARP 2006–2014 and past president of the Fort Detrick Chapter of the Association of the United States Army (AUSA).

== Awards and Honors ==
- Veterans Administration (VA) Exceptional Service Award
- League of United Latin American Citizens (LULAC) Presidential Citation Award
- Ellis Island Medal of Honor by the National Ethnic Coalition of Organizations
- Hispanic Business Magazine profiled him as one of the 100 Most Influential Hispanics

== See also ==
- List of notable Puerto Ricans
