= Oluwatoyin Sakirat Madein =

First female Accountant-General of Nigeria

- Born: March 7, 1965 (age 61); Iperu Remo, Ogun State
- Education: Walden University
- Occupation: Accountant

Oluwatoyin Sakirat Madein is the first female Accountant-General of the Federation.

== Early life and education ==
Madein was born on March 7, 1965, in Iperu Remo, Ogun State. She did primary school at AUD School Iperu,1976 and secondary education at Christ Apostolic Grammar School, Iperu in 1981. Madein obtained a Higher National Diploma (HND) in Accountancy at Ogun State Polytechnic, (now Moshood Abiola Polytechnic, Abeokuta), in 1988. A Postgraduate Diploma and master's in business administration from Ogun State University (now Olabisi Onabanjo University), Ago Iwoye.

In 2020, she completed her doctoral degree in Management Finance from Walden University, Minnesota, United States.

== Career ==
Oluwatoyin Madein began her career as a middle-level officer at the Raw Materials Research and Development Council. She later joined in pioneering the establishment of Family Economic Advancement Programme (FEAP) and National Poverty Eradication Programme (NAPEP). Madein thereafter joined mainstream civil service and her appointment was regularized by Federal Civil Service Commission. She rose through the rank to become a Director and worked in various ministries including Police Affairs, Commerce and Industry, Works and Housing, Youth and Sports Development, among others.She was the Director of Finance and Accounts at the Office of the Head of the Civil Service of the Federation until her appointment as the Accountant-General of the Federation by Muhammadu Buhari.

Prior to her joining federal service, Madein worked as an Executive Officer (Accounts) in the Ogun State Property and Investment Corporation (OPIC), Abeokuta, Ogun State.

=== Professional membership ===
- Fellow of the Association of Chartered and Certified Accountants (ACCA)
- Fellow of the Institute of Chartered Accountants of Nigeria (ICAN)
- Fellow of the Association of National Accountants of Nigeria

Fellow of the International Association of Strategy Practitioners Nigeria Member Chartered Institute of Taxation of Nigeria
