= Kathleen Fontaine =

American physicist, international policy researcher

Kathleen S. Fontaine (born 22 March 1962) is an American physicist and ethicist whose areas of interest include ethics, data policy, and applied public policy. For 25 years she was a researcher at NASA Goddard Space Flight Center and currently teaches at Rensselaer Polytechnic Institute.

== Career ==
Born in Baltimore, Maryland, Fontaine received a BS in physics and astrophysics from the New Mexico Institute of Mining and Technology in 1984. In 2002 she completed her Master of Arts in Science, Technology, and Public Policy from The George Washington University. In 2013 she completed her PhD in Public Policy and Public Administration from Walden University. Fontaine's dissertation topic for her PhD was entitled, Group on Earth Observations: A Case Study of an International Organization.

Fontaine's career has included work at the National Aeronautics and Space Administration (NASA) Global Change Data Center from 2003 to 2005 where she managed the Earth Science Data Systems Working Groups. Starting in 2005, Fontaine worked as a policy analyst for NASA until 2014. From 2014 to 2015 she was the Managing Director of RDA/US at Rensselaer Polytechnic Institute, where she began teaching in 2016.

Fontaine has been involved in policy work with several international scientific organizations. She participated in the Committee on Earth Observations Satellites (CEOS) Working Group on Information Systems and Services (WGISS); in the Group on Earth Observations (GEO). She is also a member of the Research Data Alliance and the Deep Carbon Observatory, where she is on the Data Science Team.

Among her professional memberships are the American Geophysical Union (AGU), the Association for Computing Machinery (ACM) and its web science group, the ACM policy group (US Technology Policy Committee), the Institute of Electrical and Electronics Engineers (IEEE) Geoscience and Remote Sensing Society (IEEE GRSS), and the IEEE Society on Social Implications of Technology (SSIT).

== Selected publications ==
- Fontaine, Kathleen S. "Architecture and Data Management Challenges in GEOSS and IEOS." In 2007 IEEE Aerospace Conference, pp. 1-10. IEEE, 2007.
- Fontaine, Kathy Sturey. "The Group on Earth Observations: A Case Study of an International Organization." PhD diss., Walden University, 2013.
- Rogers, Karyn L., Brenda L. Thomson, Frederick S. Colwell, Ahmed Eleish, Kathleen S. Fontaine, Peter Arthur Fox, Eric Gaidos et al. "The Census of Deep Life: Metadata Then and Now." In AGU Fall Meeting Abstracts, vol. 2018, pp. IN53C-0629. 2018.
- Fontaine, K., Bagwell, R., Callahan, B., Joyner, E., Munasingh, T. (2022) Enabling Data Dexterity Among Students Using a NASA Data Pathfinder. AGU 2022.
