= Louis LaPierre =

Canadian professor of ecology

- Born: Louis E. LaPierre; 13 August 1942
- Died: 5 March 2024 (aged 81)
- Awards: Order of Canada (resigned 2014)

Academic background
- Education: Université Sainte-Anne, BA; University of Maine MSc; Walden University, PhD
- Thesis: The evaluation of environmental education programs within Canadian universities and colleges as operant models of social change (1985)

Academic work
- Discipline: Education; Ecology; Sustainable development
- Institutions: Université de Moncton

Louis E. LaPierre (13 August 1942 – 5 March 2024) was a Canadian professor of ecology, who taught at the Université de Moncton from 1970 until his retirement in 2001. There, he held the K. C. Irving Chair in Sustainable Development from 1993 to 2001.

== Education ==
LaPeirre earned his Bachelor of Arts from Universite Sainte-Anne in 1964. He then earned a master's degree in Science Education from the University of Maine in 1974 and a PhD in Education from Walden University in 1985.

== Career ==
LaPierre served on many environmental review panels, held major positions at many Canadian environmental organizations, and developed strategies for protecting natural areas throughout New Brunswick. He served as an environmental advisor to J. D. Irving, and promoted a "scientific approach" to resolving New Brunswick's hydraulic fracturing controversy, rejecting calls for a moratorium and promoting increased shale gas exploration. In 2013, he was appointed Chair of the newly created New Brunswick Energy Institute, which was tasked with researching hydraulic fracturing in the province.

LaPierre published only a handful of peer-reviewed academic papers, including two on Canada's model forest and two on the impact of the insecticide fenitrothion. He received a Lifetime Achievement Award and an Eco-citizenship Award from Environment Canada and a 125th Anniversary of the Confederation of Canada Medal. In 2001, he received an honorary doctorate from Université Sainte-Anne.

In 2003, he was awarded professor emeritus status by the Université de Moncton. In September 2013, he resigned as professor emeritus at the Université de Moncton.

In 2012, he was made a member of the Order of Canada. On May 16, 2014, LaPierre resigned from the Order of Canada.

=== Misrepresentation of academic credentials ===
On September 4, 2013, Radio-Canada reported that LaPierre had been misrepresenting his academic credentials. Specifically, LaPierre falsely claimed that he had an M.Sc. and a Ph.D. in Ecology from the University of Maine, as opposed to his two graduate degrees in science education. Shortly thereafter, LaPierre apologized and resigned. LaPierre claimed that his degree was in conjunction with the University of Maine and Walden in 1985, though the University of Maine said no partnership agreement existed.

As a result of his falsehoods, many of LaPierre's recommendations to government and research premises were called into question. One environmental researcher said that his work for the Institute for Environmental Monitoring and Research focused on political motivations rather than environmental ones.
