= Marietta Walker =

Mother of Graceland University in America (1834–1930)

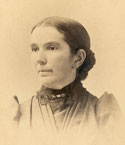
Image of Marietta Walker while she was teaching at Graceland College.

Marietta Walker (1834–1930) is an American credited as the "mother" of Graceland University.

== Early life and education ==
Marietta Hodges was born to Curtis and Lucy Clark Hodges on April 10, 1834, in Willoughby, Ohio. Curtis was from New York and Lucy from Vermont; their involvement in the Church of the Latter Day Saints led them to move to Ohio. The Hodges joined other church members as they moved from Ohio to Far West, Missouri, where they purchased a 320-acre farm. Armed conflict later broke out between the Latter Day Saint group and other Missouri settlers, and when Marietta was just four years old, her father was shot in this conflict.

On October 27, 1838, Missouri Governor Lilburn W. Boggs issued the Mormon Extermination Order, which led Latter Day Saints to leave the state. Walker and her family were among the thousands who fled and settled in Nauvoo, Illinois. Walker was nearly ten when church president Joseph Smith and his brother Hyrum were murdered; in a later article entitled "A Picture From Memory's Wall", Walker would recall seeing their dead bodies.

Later, Walker's three brothers were falsely accused of committing a series of robberies that had occurred in Lee County, Iowa. Her brothers were executed; half a century later it was determined that they had been innocent. After this event, Curtis and Lucy Hodges took the remainder of their family to Pennsylvania, where Walker's father died of illness and distress. Later, Walker was enrolled in a school for girls, she and her mother Lucy lived with one of Lucy’s married daughters. After she graduated, Walker became an assistant teacher. During this time, she converted to the Methodist Church.

Walker subsequently returned to Ohio, where she graduated from Oxford Female College in 1859. After learning that her sister Elizabeth Lyons had died, leaving behind two small daughters, she moved to Texas to care for the girls and became principal of the San Antonio Female College.

In 1860, Walker married Confederate soldier Robert Falconer. To them, a daughter Lucy was born. Shortly after their daughter's birth, Falconer died.

Walker returned to Illinois when it appeared that her mother was nearing the end of her life. She learned that her mother had converted to the Reorganized Church of Jesus Christ of Latter Day Saints (RLDS), and Walker herself subsequently converted as well. She decided to do what she could to help with the growth of her new church.

== Involvement in the church ==
Walker prepared the Inspired Version of the Holy Scriptures for printing. She later helped to copy the manuscript.

On November 7, 1869, she married Samuel Frye Walker, a philosopher, student, writer, and rancher. They moved to Nevada where they had two daughters, Francis and Lois. They then moved to what became known as Lamoni, Iowa, in 1877 to participate in building an RLDS community. While living in Lamoni, they secured land for a farm and went into the dairy business, raising large herds of cattle. In October, 1881 the Herald Publishing House was moved to Lamoni. The Walker family left their farm and moved into town. Samuel Frye Walker died soon after. Following her husband's death, Marietta devoted her time and literary talents to the church.

Marietta Walker wrote to the "Mothers' Home Column" in pursuit of raising money for a boat to use in the French Polynesian islands. In less than three years enough money was collected from offerings and a book of poetry Walker wrote entitled Afterglow.

== Involvement in the school ==
Within the RLDS Church, Walker advocated for a college or school of advanced study in Lamoni. She donated 25 acres of her own farmland for the project and secured a donation from a W. A. Hopkins for an adjoining parcel of 13 acres. The school, which would be called Graceland University, was completed in the winter of 1896 and opened with three faculty members and 21 students.

The first dormitory was for boys and was built in 1899. The girls' dormitory was built in 1906 but burned down in 1926. After a period in which the recitation hall served as a temporary residence for the girls, a new girl's dormitory was opened in 1929. It was named Walker Hall in her honor. For all of her efforts in founding Graceland University, Walker is referred to as the "mother of Graceland."

Marietta never wanted recognition, she often wrote under the name of Frances. She encouraged others to work for the service they could give and not for the honor they might receive. Walker's life motto was, "Get thy spindle and thy distaff ready, and God will send thee flax,"

With the coming of old age, vision, and hearing loss, Walker died in California on April 12, 1930, at the age of ninety-six. She was buried with her husband in Rose Hill Cemetery in Lamoni, Iowa.
