= Robert Levasseur (management scholar) =

Robert Levasseur is a professor at Walden University in the College of Management & Technology School of Management with a specialization in leadership and organizational change.

== Early life ==
A native of Maine, Dr. Levasseur received a BA in physics from Bowdoin College, a BS in electrical engineering from MIT, an MS in electrical engineering from Northeastern University, an MS in management from the MIT Sloan School of Management, and a Ph.D. in applied management and decision sciences from Walden University.

== Career ==
Dr. Levasseur has taught numerous qualitative and quantitative management courses at Boston University, University of Maryland University College, and the University of the Virgin Islands, and has authored seven books. He previously held professional and leadership positions in major U.S. corporations during a nearly 30-year business career. He is the Founder and President of MindFire Press, which provides resources for lifelong learning.

Dr. Levasseur wrote his Ph.D. Dissertation on the subject of transforming leadership. He was interested in the impact that a modern leadership style has on follower performance and job satisfaction. To study this relationship, he used the meta-analysis research method.

Meta-analysis allows a researcher to combine the numerical findings of a variety of original studies into an aggregate measure. Because of the much larger sample size that results from combining multiple studies, the aggregate measure (called an effect size statistic) is a much better statistical estimator of the phenomenon in question.

To facilitate the transition to more collaborative forms of leadership, Dr. Levasseur conducted a study that examined the impact of leaders who use modern styles of leadership, characterized as visionary, charismatic, or transformational, to motivate their followers to achieve higher levels of performance and job satisfaction. Although the new millennium requires leaders to engage followers in the change process, many leaders seem reluctant to embrace modern methods of transforming leadership despite evidence of their effectiveness.

Dr. Levasseur used meta-analysis, a research method useful for combining the quantitative findings of a number of primary research studies, to synthesize the findings of 7 experiments and 27 correlational studies of transforming leadership published in the past 15 years. The meta-analysis provided effect size estimates of the relationship between leadership style and two follower outcomes, performance and satisfaction. The meta-analysis also provided estimates of the magnitude and statistical significance of four factors that prior research indicated might affect these relationships: (a) research design (i.e., experimental or correlational study); (b) subject of analysis (i.e., individual or group); (c) type of participant (i.e., student, military, or worker); and (d) type of performance measurement (i.e., objective or subjective).

Based on the correlational data from the studies in the research sample, the meta-analysis synthesis yielded medium to strong positive correlations between a transforming leadership style and follower performance and satisfaction. Smaller, but statistically significant, positive effect sizes from the experiments included in the study supported these findings. The four study characteristics explained little of the residual variance in the data. Research design and participant type explained a small, but statistically significant, amount of the unexplained variation. However, the impact of subject of analysis and type of performance measurement on the residual variance in the data was not statistically significant.

Dr. Levasseur's study concludes with a series of recommendations based on these findings for further study and for proactive leadership actions to implement transforming leadership in organizations and thereby effect positive social change.

Dr. Levasseur, a faculty member at one of America's premier online Ph.D. granting universities for 20 years, teaches doctoral courses and serves on the dissertation committees of students of management and public policy and administration. To date, Dr. Levasseur has worked with over 100 students to help them achieve their goal of earning a doctorate.

== Areas of expertise ==
Dr. Robert Levasseur is an expert in leadership and change, quantitative methods, marketing science, general management, and engineering management.

== Research ==
Dr. Robert Levasseur's research is in the areas of leadership, organizational change and development, operations research and data analysis, management theory and practice, collaborative meeting management, and high-performance team development.

== People skills and team development ==
7 things that a group leader must do

1. Acknowledge the importance of teamwork and the task that has to be completed

2. Create rules for group behaviour

3. Develop a shared vision for everyone in the group. Make sure that they know what has to be done

4. Collaborative processes must be used throughout the project

5. Use action/ research to help you decide what you must do next

6. Manage conflict when it arises

7. Involve users in the process from the outset

== Publications ==
=== Books ===
Build the Perfect Team (MindFire Press, 2022)
Dissertation Research: An Integrative Approach (MindFire Press, 2011)
Transforming Leadership: A Meta-Analysis (VDM Verlag, 2008)
Student to Scholar: The Guide for Doctoral Students (MindFire Press, 2006)
Practical Statistics (MindFire Press, 2006)
Leadership and Change in the 21st Century: A Synthesis of Modern Theory, Research, and Practice (MindFire Press, 2006)
Breakthrough Business Meetings: Shared Leadership in Action (iUniverse.com, 2000)

=== Articles ===
New OD: An Integrative Perspective (Organization Development Journal, Volume 28, Issue 3, Fall 2010, pp. 21–26)
Finding a Dissertation Topic (MindFire Press, 2007, pp. 1–9)
ABCs of APA Style (MindFire Press, 2007, pp. 1–13)
Leading Breakthrough Meetings (MindFire Press, 2006, pp. 1–9)
Five Ways to Involve and Energize Your Students (Teaching for Success, March 2001, pp. 4–5)
Breaking the Silence: 10 Ways to Improve Input in Your Next Small Meeting (Successful Meetings, December 1995, pp. 61–63)
Open System Theory and Organizations (Futurics, Volume 28, Issues 1 & 2, 2004, pp. 79–85)

Interfaces People Skills Column 19 Articles:

Building the Perfect Team—A Change Management Perspective (Volume 47, Volume 3, May–June 2017, pp. 270–272)
Building Analytics Decision Models That Managers Use—A Change Management Perspective (Volume 45, Issue 4, July–August 2015, pp. 363–364)
Developing Soft Skills—A Change Management Perspective (Volume 43, Issue 6, November–December 2013, pp, 566–571)
Leading Virtual Teams—A Change Management Perspective (Volume 42, Issue 2, March–April 2012, pp. 213–216)
Optimizing Team Development and Performance (Volume 41, Issue 2, March–April 2011, pp. 204–208)
Ensuring Project Success—A Change Management Perspective (Volume 40, Issue 2, March–April 2010, pp. 159–162)
Implementing Strategic Goals—A Change Management Perspective (Volume 39, Issue 4, July–August 2009, pp. 370–372)
Marketing OR/MS—A People Problem (Volume 37, Issue 4, July–August 2007, pp. 383–384)
Change Management Tools—Leading Teams (Volume 35, Issue 2, March–April 2005, pp. 179–180)
Change Management Tools—The Modern Leadership Model (Volume 34, Issue 2, March–April 2004, pp. 147–148)
Change Management Tools—Ideal State Analysis (Volume 32, Issue 4, July–August 2002, pp. 84–85
Change Management Tools—Lewin's Change Model (Volume 31, Issue 4, July–August 2001, pp. 71–73)
Launching a Cooperative Learning Team (Volume 26, Issue 6, November–December 1996, pp. 112–116)
Students: Don't Make the Grade but Miss the Point (Volume 24, Issue 4, July–August 1994, pp. 126–128)
How to Improve the Odds of a Successful Project Implementation (Volume 23, Issue 4, July–August 1993, pp. 85–87)
The Need to Change: Problem or Opportunity? (Volume 22, Issue 3, May–June 1992, pp. 115–116)
What Every Professional Should Know about Designing and Managing Meetings (Volume 22, Issue 2, March–April 1992, pp. 11–14)
Effective Communication: A Critical Skill for MS/OR Professionals (Volume 21, Issue 2, March–April 1991, pp. 22–24)
Self-Awareness—A Critical Skill for MS/OR Professionals (Volume 21, Issue 1, January–February 1991, pp. 130–133)

=== Other professional publications ===
The Impact of a Transforming Leadership Style on Follower Performance and Satisfaction: A Meta-Analysis (Doctoral Dissertation, Walden University, Ann Arbor: UMI Dissertation Services, May 2004)

== Professional memberships ==
Institute for Operations Research and the Management Sciences (INFORMS)
International Society for Organization Development and Change
System Dynamics Society
US Golf Teachers Federation
Authors Guild
