= Earle Newton =

American historian and art collector

- Born: April 10, 1917; Cortland, New York, US
- Died: May 24, 2006 (aged 89); Ponte Vedra, Florida, US
- Education: Amherst College (BA); Columbia University (MA); Walden University (PhD)
- Occupations: Historian, preservationist, publisher, educator

Earle W. Newton, II (1917–2006) was a historian, preservationist, publisher, educator, and art benefactor.

== Early life and education ==
Newton was born on April 10, 1917, in Cortland, New York. He attended Phillips Academy and received a bachelor's degree from Amherst College in 1938, a master's degree from Columbia University in 1939, and a Ph.D from Walden University in 1974. He was also a Fulbright Scholar in the mid-1950s and received a diploma in museum administration from the University of Bristol.

== Career ==
After graduating from Columbia, Newton was the Director of Historical Research for Webster Publishing Company in St. Louis, Missouri. His first post in a long career in cultural heritage was as the director of the Vermont Historical Society in Barre, Vermont, where he worked from 1942–1950. During this time, he helped found two magazines, American Heritage and Vermont Life. From 1944–1946, he took a two-year hiatus from Vermont during World War II to serve in the U.S. Navy as a lieutenant at Pearl Harbor.

Newton served as director of Old Sturbridge Village in Sturbridge, Massachusetts from 1950–1954, and then spent two years pursuing academic research; first as the director of the Institute on Historical and Archival Management at Harvard University and Radcliffe College, and then as a Fulbright fellow in England. He was a senior research scholar at the University of London as well as a lecturer at Uppsala University in Sweden. When Newton returned to the United States in 1956 he became the director of Pennsylvania's Bureau of Museums and Historic Sites and Properties. During this time he also served as director of the Museum of Art, Science, and Industry in Bridgeport, Connecticut.

In 1959, Newton was hired to serve as the executive director of the newly established St. Augustine Historical Restoration and Preservation Commission, whose goal was to restore and reconstruct historic buildings in downtown St. Augustine, Florida. They hoped these buildings would become part of a Spanish colonial museum village in similar fashion to Colonial Williamsburg or Old Sturbridge Village. He also became the director-general of the National Quadricentennial Commission, a committee appointed by President John F. Kennedy to plan St. Augustine's 400th anniversary celebration. In 1962, he became the president of St. Augustine Restoration, Inc., a foundation created by the St. Augustine Historical Restoration and Preservation Commission to raise private funds for restoration work in the city. The fact that the St. Augustine program was all-white in its conception and implementation brought it into conflict with the civil rights movement of the 1960s, and resulted in widely publicized demonstrations in the Ancient City, led by Dr. Robert Hayling and Dr. Martin Luther King. Newton, along with St. Augustine Mayor Joseph Shelley went on the "Today Show" on national television to criticize the civil rights movement in 1964--a story told in Pulitzer-prizewinning author Taylor Branch's "Pillar of Fire" (Simon & Schuster, 1998).

Newton resigned as director of the Commission in 1968 and became the director of the Pensacola Historical Restoration and Preservation Commission. He founded the Museum of the Americas in Brookfield, Vermont and was a professor in art at Norwich College in Northfield, Vermont. This museum, which was housed in an old church, was visited by art dealer Philip Mould and found to contain over three hundred works by artists such as William Hogarth and Joseph Wright of Derby, as well as American painters such as Gilbert Stuart and Robert Feke. When Mould made his visit, however, the paintings were found to be "mostly in various stages decay, with layers of mildew covering their surfaces" and Mould described it as "not a museum collection, it was a hidden hoard."

He later returned to St. Augustine to once again serve as director of the Commission, since renamed the Historic St. Augustine Preservation Board. The Preservation Board was abolished by the State of Florida in 1997 in accordance with the Sundown Act.

== Personal life and legacy ==
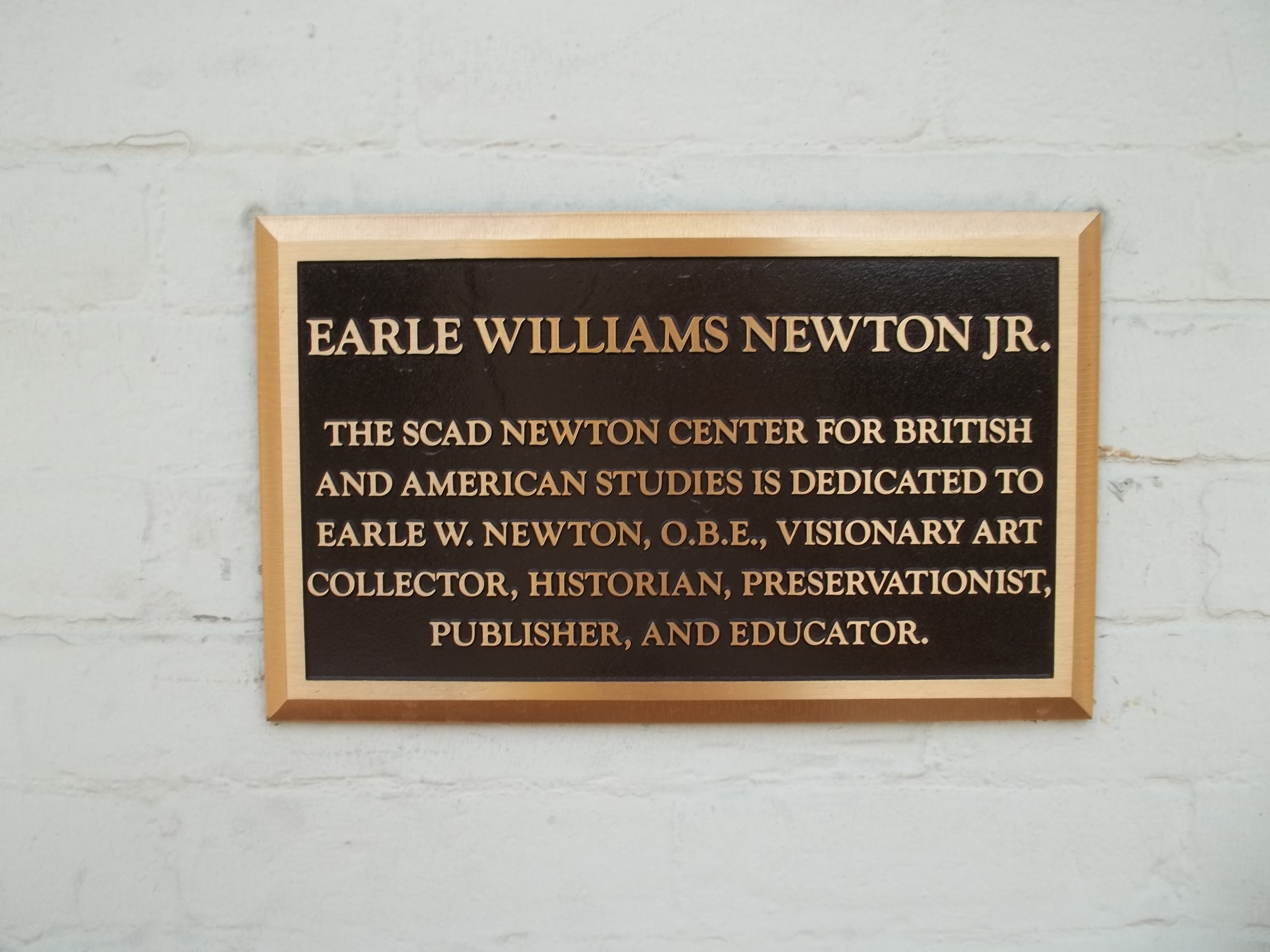
Newton Center Plaque

Newton died on May 24, 2006, in Ponte Vedra, Florida at the age of 89. Newton married his wife Josephine in 1937, and they had two children, Antoinette and Earle III.

Newton was the recipient of many awards and honors throughout his life, including Knight Commander of the Order of Isabella la Catolica from Spain in 1965 and Officer of the British Empire from England in 2003. He was an avid collector of British and American art and the Newton Center for British Art at the Savannah College of Arts and Design was opened in 2002 (renamed the SCAD Museum of Art). The Earle W. Newton Collection of British and American Art resides in the Jen Library at SCAD. The collection includes over 200 portraits by artists including Anthony Van Dyck, Sir Joshua Reynolds, Thomas Gainsborough, Gilbert Stuart, and William Hogarth, over 1,400 prints, as well as early maps.

== Bibliography ==
- Before Pearl Harbor (1942)
- The Upper Connecticut: Narratives of Its Settlement and Its Part in the American Revolution (1943)
- The Vermont Story : A History of the People of the Green Mountain State, 1749-1949 (1949)
- Our American Heritage, An Interpretation (1954)
- Historic architecture of Pensacola (1969)
- In Search of Gulf Coast Colonial History (1970)
- Spain and her Rivals on the Gulf Coast (1971)
- The Americanization of the Gulf Coast 1803-1850 (1972)
