= T. Sher Singh =

Disbarred Canadian lawyer

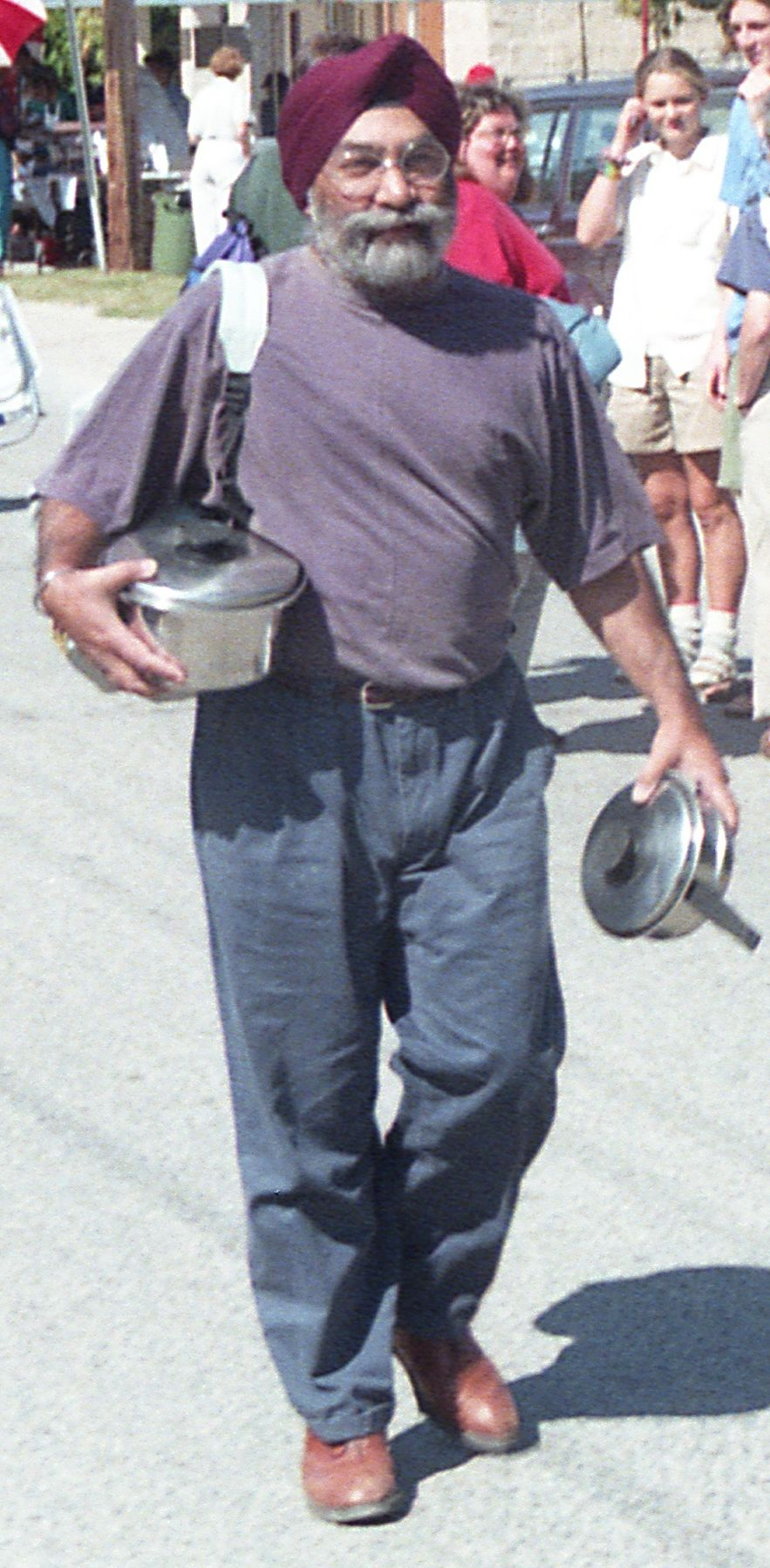
T. Sher Singh in Eden Mills, Ontario (mid-1990s)

Tapishar Sher Singh (born 1949) is a former lawyer who was disbarred in 2007 by the Law Society of Upper Canada.

== Early years ==
Singh was born in Patna, Dominion of India in 1949 to Ishar Singh and Mahinder Kaur. He grew up in Patna, and graduated with a BA (and incomplete MA degree) before arriving in Canada in 1971 and then went to Lakehead University. After years working a various jobs, Singh studied and applied for law school and completed his Ontario bar exams to practise as a litigation lawyer in Guelph, Ontario.

== Legal problems ==
His professional misconduct, including the misappropriation of funds and continuing to practise after being suspended, caused Singh to be removed from the Order of Canada on 10 December 2008. He is also barred from practising as a lawyer in the province of Ontario.

== Internet activity ==
Tapishar was the founder of sikhchic.com. He is an editor and publisher for the website.

== See also ==
- Removal from the Order of Canada
