= René Racine =

Canadian academic and astronomer (1939–2025)

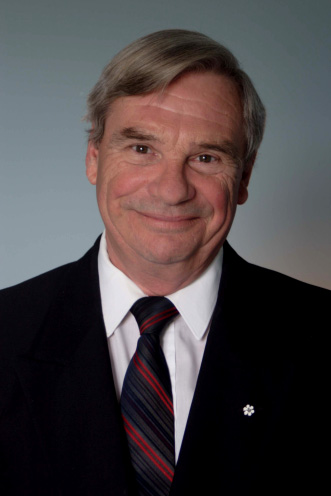
- Racine in 2009
- Born: 16 October 1939; Quebec City, Quebec, Canada
- Died: 18 December 2025 (aged 86); Quebec City, Quebec, Canada
- Occupations: Academic, astronomer

René Racine MSRC OQ (16 October 1939 – 18 December 2025) was a French-Canadian academic and astronomer who specialised in the study of globular clusters.

== Life and career ==
Racine was born in Quebec City. He obtained a bachelor's degree in physics from Laval University in 1963, and master's and doctoral degrees (Ph.D in astronomy) in 1965 and in 1967, respectively, from the University of Toronto. He received a research scholarship at the Carnegie Institute.

Between 1967 and 1969, he was a Carnegie Fellow at the Mount Wilson and Palomar Observatories near Pasadena, California in the United States. He operated the Mt. Mégantic Observatory from 1976–1980, the Canada-France-Hawaii Telescope from 1980–1984, and then returning to Mt. Mégantic Observatory from 1984–1997.

In 1994, Racine and colleagues recalibrated the value of the Hubble constant, which helps to measure extragalactic distances, and the size and the age of the Universe.

On 10 February 2000, Denis Bergeron, in Val-des-Bois, was the first to discover an asteroid from Quebec. The asteroid, 45580 Renéracine, was named in honor of Racine.

Racine was made a member of the Order of Canada in 1999. In 2009, Racine resigned from the Order to protest Henry Morgentaler's appointment. Racine remained in the Ordre National du Québec.

Racine died in Quebec City on 18 December 2025, at the age of 86.

== Accolades ==
- Price Léon Lortie of Saint-Jean-Baptiste Society of Montreal in 1988.
- Member of the Royal Society of Canada in 1989.
- Member of the Astronomical Society of the Pacific in 1991.
- Beals of the Canadian Astronomical Society in 1992.
- Scientist Award of the year by the Canadian Broadcasting Corporation in 1994.
- Order of Canada in 1999, resigned the honour in 2009.
- Queen Elizabeth II (2002, 1977) Golden Jubilee Medal of Her Majesty.
