= Lettuce club =

Type of student organization

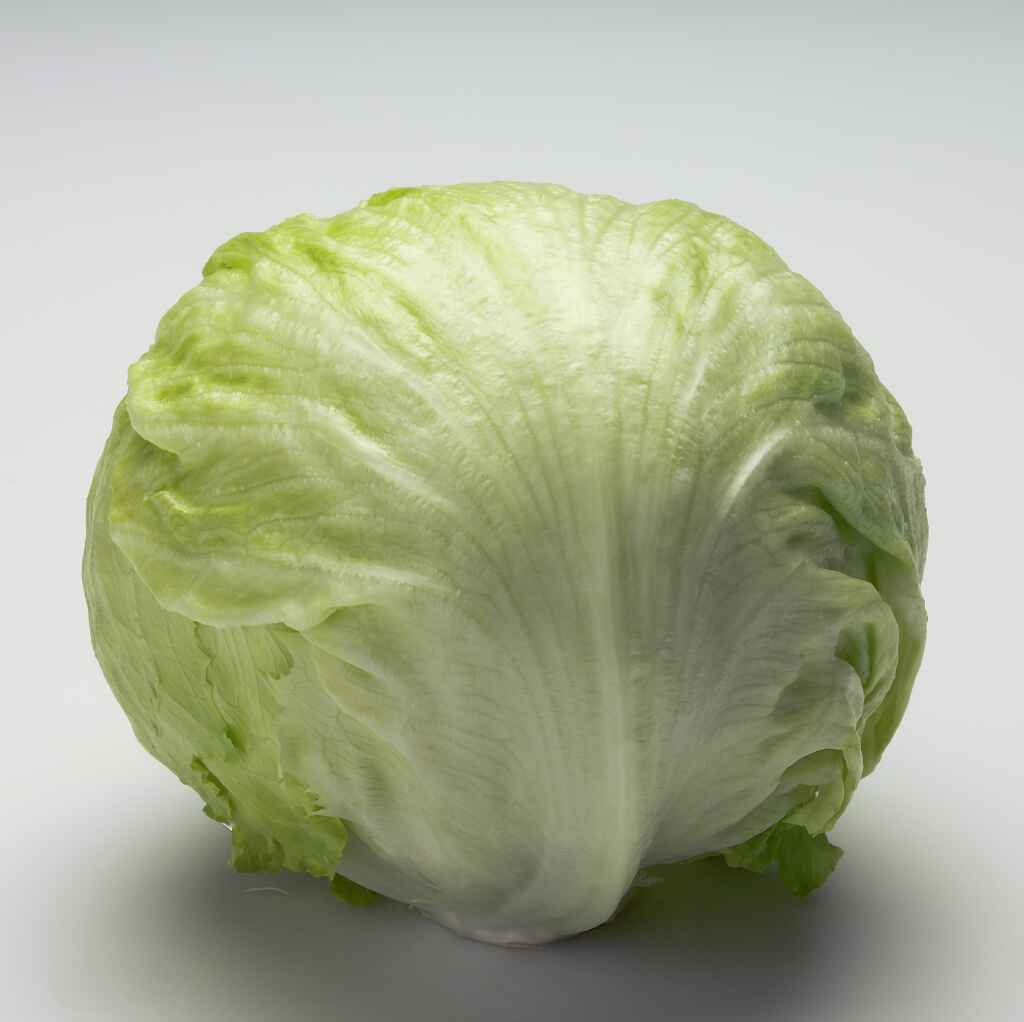
A head of iceberg lettuce

A lettuce club is a student organization that holds events in which members compete to be the first to finish eating an entire head of lettuce. Originating at the Maine School of Science and Mathematics, the phenomenon of lettuce clubs spread after being mentioned in a viral Tumblr post.

== Instances ==
=== At colleges and universities ===
A lettuce club at the University of Maryland, College Park was founded in 2017 and held two competitions that year before ceasing activity. Because the lettuce club had not been officially recognized by the university, Stamp Student Union declined to host further club events, contributing to the group's decline.

A lettuce club was founded at the University of South Carolina in 2020 by a student in the school's Honors College, recruiting over 80 members in its first year of operation after gaining official recognition from the school, and holding one meeting per semester. The winner of the competition at a given meeting is named "Head of Lettuce" and charged with planning the next semester's meeting.

Lettuce compete today with honor, glory, and most importantly a mild appetite for leafy vegetables. If we find ourselves growing weak, let the strength of the mighty iceberg carry us. Even if we do not win, we will be grateful for this little gem of a club and for those of us that will go on to compete in the future, we butter be prepared to toss salad once again.

— The Lettuce Creed as delivered by Jack Walsh, president of the lettuce club at the University of Minnesota

A lettuce club at the University of Minnesota was holding two meetings per year as of 2021. For the club's fall 2021 competition, which was the subject of a documentary film by Barstool Sports, members were asked to bring their own lettuce; only iceberg lettuce was allowed, and only students with one semester remaining were allowed to participate.

500g Iceberg is regulation. Do not bring a cabbage.

— Arielle Lok, Founder of McGill University's Lettuce Club

A lettuce club was founded at McGill University in 2021, with the first meeting drawing more than 150 attendees. Competitors were required to bring their own head of iceberg lettuce weighing no less than 500 grams (18 oz). The 2021 winner finished his lettuce in three minutes and 45 seconds, and was placed in charge of planning the next meeting in his role as "Head of Lettuce". Subsequent meetings were successfully hosted in 2022, 2023, and 2024 with a modified ruleset (increasing from 500g to 600g), drawing more than 200 attendees each year. The 2022 winner finished his lettuce in a minute and 54 seconds. The 2023 winner finished his lettuce in 2 minutes and ~10 seconds. The 2024 winner finished his lettuce in 2 minutes and 58 seconds. The McGill Lettuce Club is still active.

=== At secondary schools ===
At the Maine School of Science and Mathematics, where the first lettuce club originated, the lettuce for competitions is purchased from Walmart; the first contestant to finish eating their head of lettuce is named "Head Lettuce" and awarded a championship belt.

A lettuce club was founded at Heritage High School in Frisco, Texas in 2017, inspired by a post one of the founders saw on Twitter about lettuce clubs elsewhere. As of 2018, the club held its annual competitions at the end of each school year. The winner of a competition became the club's new president. At the 2018 competition, music from the 1980s including "Eye of the Tiger" was played during the competition.
