= Assisted Human Reproduction Act =

Act of the Parliament of Canada

Parliament of Canada
- Long title: An Act respecting assisted human reproduction and related research
- Citation: S.C. 2004, c. 2
- Considered by: Parliament of Canada
- Assented to: March 29, 2004
- Commenced: ss. 1 to 7, 9 to 11, 13, 20, 60 to 71 and 73 in force 22 April 2004; ss. 21 to 39, 72, 74, 75 and 77, other than par. 24(1)(a), (e) and (g), in force 12 January 2006; s. 8 in force 1 December 2007; ss. 12, 14 to 19, par. 24(1)(a), (e) and (g), ss. 40 to 59 and 76 come into force on a day or days to be fixed by order of the Governor in Council

Legislative history
- Bill citation: Bill C-6, 37th Parliament
- Introduced by: Pierre Pettigrew, Minister of Health
- First reading: February 11, 2004,
- Second reading: February 11, 2004
- Third reading: February 11, 2004
- Committee report: House: February 11, 2004 Committee of the Whole, Senate: March 9, 2004 (Canadian Senate Standing Committee on Social Affairs, Science and Technology)
- First reading: February 11, 2004
- Second reading: February 13, 2004
- Third reading: March 11, 2004

Amended by
- Access to Information Act; Financial Administration Act; Privacy Act; Public Service Staff Relations Act; Public Service Superannuation Act
- Status: Current legislation

The Assisted Human Reproduction Act (French: Loi sur la procréation assistée) is law enacted by the Parliament of Canada. Its purpose is to regulate assisted human reproduction (AHR) and related research. It is one of the most comprehensive pieces of legislation in the world concerning reproductive technologies and related research. It was introduced and passed in 2004 and was fully in force by 2007.

The Act was meant to provide Canadians with a system of licensing, monitoring, inspection and enforcement of activities relating to AHR in order to protect and promote Canadians' health, safety and values. It identifies prohibited activities, as well as controlled activities, which are AHR activities that can be performed in Canada but require a licence and adherence to the regulations. However, a 2010 Supreme Court case that ruled that certain sections of the Act exceeded the federal government's legislative power means that the scope of the Act's regulatory framework was significantly reduced (see below).

== Constitutional validity ==
On December 22, 2010, the Supreme Court of Canada declared some sections of the Assisted Human Reproduction Act unconstitutional. It was ruled that the sections listed below exceeded the legislative jurisdiction of the Parliament of Canada under the Constitution Act, 1867:

- 10,11,13: Certain provisions regarding controlled activities
- 14-18: Certain provisions regarding privacy and access to information
- 40(2), 40(3), 40(3.1), 40(4), 40(5), 44(2), 44(3): Certain provisions regarding administration

== Status of Act's provisions ==
= in force April 22, 2004
= in force January 12, 2006
= December 1, 2007
= unconstitutional
= not yet in force (as of February 2012)

Sections	Current status
1-7	
8	
9	
10-11	
12	
13-18	
19	
20	
21-23	
24 (excepting (a), (e) and (g) of 24(1))	
(a), (e) and (g) of 24(1)	
25-39	
40 - subsections (1), (6) and (7)	
40 - remainder of section	
41-43	
44 - subsections (1) and (4)	
44 - remainder of section	
45-59	
60-71	
72	
73	
74	
75	
76	
77	
78	

== Content ==
=== Prohibited activities ===
Prohibited activities, defined in sections 5 to 9 of the Act, are AHR activities that Parliament has determined to be ethically unacceptable or incompatible with Canadian values, or to pose significant risks to the health, safety and values of Canadians. These activities are not allowed in Canada. Prohibitions include:

- Creating an in vitro embryo for any purpose other than creating a human being or improving or providing instruction in assisted reproduction procedures
- Human cloning.
- Pre-selecting or increasing the probability that an embryo will be a particular sex (except to prevent a sex-linked genetic condition).
- Transplanting a sperm, egg, embryo or foetus of a non-human life form into a human being, or using a sperm, egg, or in vitro embryo that was transplanted into a non-human life form to create a human being
- Creating a hybrid for the purpose of reproduction, or transplanting a hybrid into a human being or non-human life form
- Creating a chimera for any purpose, or transplanting a chimera into a human being or non-human life form
- Using gametes or in vitro embryos without the consent of the donor of the gametes or embryo
- Obtaining gametes from a person under 18 years of age (except for own use preservation purposes)
- Paying, offering to pay, or advertising payment for sperm, eggs or in vitro embryos from donors or for the services of surrogate mothers (including payment to a third party for arranging for the services of a surrogate mother)

This last prohibition prevents the "commercialization" of human reproduction in Canada. While the Act currently allows donors and surrogate mothers to be reimbursed for legitimate expenses, Health Canada is developing specific regulations about what constitutes a legitimate expenditure.

=== Controlled activities ===
Controlled activities, set out in sections 10 to 12 of the Act, are AHR activities permitted if performed in accordance with regulations and by a licensed clinic or individual in licensed premises. However, section 10, which addressed the "use of human reproductive material," and section 11, which addressed "transgenics," were ruled ultra vires. Section 12, which addresses the "reimbursement of expenditures" for providing gametes and surrogacy services, is intra vires but is not yet in force.
