= Humour in Sikhism =

Humour in Sikhism refers to the relationship between Sikhs and humour. In Sikhism, devotion is not seen as being antithetical to comedy but rather the two can be conjoined together.

== History ==
Many hagiographical Sikh stories involve humour. One sakhi (tale) linked to Sikhs having a sense of humour is when Guru Nanak visited Haridwar. In the morning, whilst people were tossing water in the direction of the Sun, instead Guru Nanak took some water and began tossing it toward his field in Kartarpur, located very far away. Onlookers, including the pundits, questioned Guru Nanak on what he was doing, with Guru Nanak rebuking that his fields in Kartarpur were much closer than the Sun and that if tossing the water at the Sun would reach it, then tossing the water at Kartarpur would definitely help irrigate his crops. The reasoning behind this action was to rebuke the prevailing belief that throwing water to the east would reach ancestors beyond the grave. Modern Sikhs find humour in this story but it is unknown if the pilgrims and local clergy who met Guru Nanak and were exposed to this incident at the time found humour in it.

Whilst at Mecca, another tale narrates that Guru Nanak pointed his feet toward the Kaaba whilst laying down at night. When he was reprimanded for doing so by the local Islamic clergy, he replied that they should then turn his feet in the direction where God is not present. A story of Guru Nanak visiting Baghdad says that in the morning time, the Guru wanted to gather his own congregation, so he created his own Azaan call and performed it by yelling at a high-altitude location. People became curious upon hearing this new kind of call to prayer and came to see him. Another legend narrates that once Guru Nanak came upon happy children who were playing, jumping, and having fun in the street whilst he was travelling. Upon seeing the children, Guru Nanak also began to jump, shout, and sing like them.

A funny story also involved Guru Nanak and a pundit named Kalyug. Kalyug claimed to have the power to see the spiritual realm of Shivapuri, Brahmpuri, and other Indic mythological abodes. Kalyug would instruct devotees to meditate with him by closing their eyes, claiming to guide them through a celestial astral projection. At one of these meditation events whilst everyone's eyes were closed, Guru Nanak told Bhai Mardana to take Kalyug's donation bowl and hide it behind a bush. When Kalyug's meditation event finished, he exclaimed that someone had taken his donation bowl and asked where it was, until a large crowd had gathered. Guru Nanak then told him that he claims to be able to see celestial realms yet he cannot meditate and search the Universe for where his donation bowl had gone.

A story, involving miracles, related to Guru Angad and Amar Das, on the topic of tolerating things seen as offensive, tells that Amar Das once became irritated at a perceived transgression against Guru Angad by farmers and a holyman. In the midst of a drought, a holyman convinced a group of farmers that they should abandon their following of Guru Angad and instead follow him if they hoped for their crops to receive rain. The farmers started following this man instead of Angad, yet the drought did not cease as they had hoped for. Amar Das heard of what was happening and instructed the farmers to drag the holyman wherever they wished to receive rain. The farmers dragged the holyman to their fields, where it then rained. Guru Angad found out about this and rebuked Amar Das for performing a miracle and that even grave insults to Sikhs, such as one targeting a Sikh guru, should be tolerated by Sikhs.

Another tale tells of Guru Amar Das, in his elderly years, being kicked whilst seated by an upset relative of his predecessory guru. Instead of getting upset, Guru Amar Das started massaging the relative's foot and said the old bones in the foot must have hurt when he kicked him. This tale instructs Sikhs to even take serious and offensive actions in a light-hearted manner.

Guru Arjan, knowing the power and effectiveness of humour, inserted a humorous hymn attributed to Bhagat Dhanna into his compilation of the first edition of the Adi Granth:

O God, I, Thine afflicted servant, come to Thee. Thou arrangest the affairs of those who perform Thy service. I beg of Thee to give me flour, ghee, and pulse, so that my heart may rejoice for ever. I want shoes and fine clothes, and corn grown on a field ploughed seven times over. I want a milch cow and a buffalo, and a good Turkustani mare, and a good wife. These things Thy servant Dhanna begs of Thee.

— Bhagat Dhanna, Dhanasri Raga, Guru Granth Sahib

Another amusing verse in the primary Sikh scripture is attributed to Bhagat Kabir in Sorath Raga, which states that he cannot keep praying to God if he continues to keep him hungry, he then lists foods he desires to eat.

Bhai Bidhi Chand was said to have been a funny man during his numerous exploits. A sect of Udasis, known as Suthras, are considered traditional humourists of the religion and carry-on Guru Nanak's teachings in this manner to propagate the religion. According to Harijot Singh Khalsa, the Sikh concept of Chardi kala, also allows for joking and being ironic but it does not allow for sarcastic jokes and jokes at the expense of others.

In Guru Gobind Singh's previous incarnation, known as Rishi Dusht Daman, it is said a pilgrim wanted to meet the Rishi in his isolated dwelling place in the mountains, but upon drawing closer, he heard intimidating and loud laughter the closer he got, which eventually scared him away. It is claimed that one time Guru Gobind Singh dressed-up a donkey like a lion and let it loose in the fields. When his followers began laughing at the sight, Guru Gobind Singh stated that his Singhs (meaning "lion") would also look just as foolish if they dressed up as a Khalsa and adopted a Khalsa name, yet they still remained "ignorant" or "cowardly". Other examples of dark humour displayed by Guru Gobind Singh involve incidents relating to Pundit Kesho failing to summon the goddess Durga, with Guru Gobind Singh taking out a sword eventually and stating that the sword itself is the goddess of power. Another example is when Guru Gobind Singh requested a volunteer for a human sacrifice from amidst his gathered congregates, to see if they anyone would be willing to go above and beyond recitation of hymns and scriptural reading. Sikh oral history claims Guru Gobind Singh usually had a smile on his face but that he rarely laughed because if he did, then his followers would follow in laughter in an extremely high-spirited and cheerful manner, so the Guru did not want them to be distracted and lose focus. However, another story claims that Guru Gobind Singh encouraged members of the Khalsa to humour others and make them guffaw. Guru Gobind Singh taught the Khalsa to use humour when meeting with crowds of commoners to create a positive atmosphere.

Another event from Sikh history tells of a small jatha of Sikhs who were threatened by a larger enemy force. These outnumbered Sikhs took their wide, white chaddars (sheets) and spread them over nearby bushes to make them look like tents when viewed from far away. Then, they began shouting the Sat Sri Akal jaikara (battle cry) for intervals spaced-out by 15 minutes. Thus, they tricked their opponents into thinking they were more numerous than they actually were and hostilities ceased.

Khalsa Bole, a unique lect spoken by Nihang Sikhs, contains many humorous examples of vocabulary filled with irony.

Sikhs have also invented jokes about Muslims.

In 1990, the first volume of a series of joke books authored by Khushwant Singh, was published by Orient Paperbacks. The last and eighth volume was released in 2012.

Dalbir Singh invented "Sikh Park", based on the popular cartoon South Park, to transgress prevailing stereotypes on Sikhs. Dalbir Singh had never actually watched an episode of South Park before creating Sikh Park. The cartoon originated from the website SikhChic.com, after it opened up a section dedicated to humour. Dalbir was inspired to create the comic after Sikhs began facing attacks and discrimination in the aftermath of the September 11 attacks, to show that Sikhs are both progressive and witty. Dalbir wanted to combat the prevailing sardar ji type jokes that are commonly circulated to show that more positive jokes involving Sikhs are possible. The initial feedback from the community to the comic was positive. Whilst the cartoon was created with the intentions that it was to be enjoyed by diasporic Sikhs and NRI Sikhs, many Desis from different backgrounds enjoy it. Many of the jokes in Sikh Park are about turbans. A common theme in the cartoon is a young Sikh boy with his trendy grandfather. After Dalbir moved to India, he Indianized Sikh Park so it could be more relatable to actual Indians living in India.

== Jokes targetting Sikhs ==
There are categories of jokes where Sikhs are made fun of. Sikhs are often portrayed as incompetent, energetic, and uneducated in these kind of jokes. According to Khushwant Singh, many jokes targeting Sikhs were originally created by Sikhs themselves. An example of one joke about Hanuman in the Ramayana actually being a Sikh is based on the apparent carelessness of Hanuman burning his own tail, which inadvertently not just burns down his enemy's palace but also an entire city. One type of joke, known as bara baje or the mid-day joke, is based on the perception that Sikhs "go crazy" at noon due to the effects of heat on having uncut hair, causing incidents.

Some Sikhs have chosen to respond to sardarji type jokes in a humorous manner as it is considered impolite to get overly offended by jokes making fun of your community. One story involves a Sikh taxi driver being exposed to sardarji jokes during a trip by his young customers. When the taxi trip ends, he tells the young passengers leaving that some of the jokes were in poor taste but he does not mind because they are young and inexperienced. He then gives them a rupee coin and requests them to give the coin to the first sardar beggar they see in the city or anywhere else. Chocka Lingam, one of the passengers, admits in 2009 that they never ended up giving the coin away as they did not encounter a sardar beggar. There is a belief that Sikh sardars cannot be found begging.

There have been attempts to ban anti-Sikh jokes in India. Advocates of the ban claim that over 5,000 websites exist which poke fun at the expense of Sikhs. These kind of jokes portray Sikhs as stupid, foolish, naive, inept, and bad at English. Some Sikh children want to rid themselves of their Sikh-identifying surnames to avoid being targeted by anti-Sikh jokes. A type of joke that has been called to be banned are Santa Banta jokes, which involve two characters named Santa Singh and Banta Singh. Critics have argued that banning these kind of jokes violates freedom of speech, as protected in the Indian constitution. Some Sikhs themselves are against the proposed ban.

Jawaharlal Handoo claims that the success of the Sikh minority in modern India causes anxiety in the non-Sikh masses and hurts their ego, so jokes targeting Sikhs were coined to alleviate their insecurities.

== Scriptural examples ==
=== Guru Granth Sahib ===
Many excerpts from the Guru Granth Sahib have been cited as allowing for humour, such as the following:

ਪਾਇਓ ਬਾਲ ਬੁਧਿ ਸੁਖੁ ਰੇ ॥

Adopting the innocent mind of a child, I have found peace.

—Guru Granth Sahib, page 214

Other examples are as follows:

ਨਾਨਕ ਸਤਿਗੁਰਿ ਭੇਟਿਐ ਪੂਰੀ ਹੋਵੈ ਜੁਗਤਿ ॥
ਹਸੰਦਿਆ ਖੇਲੰਦਿਆ ਪੈਨੰਦਿਆ ਖਾਵੰਦਿਆ ਵਿਚੇ ਹੋਵੈ ਮੁਕਤਿ ॥੨॥

O Nanak, meeting the True Guru, one comes to know the Perfect Way.
While laughing, playing, dressing and eating, he is liberated. ||2||

—Guru Granth Sahib, page 522

ਹਸਤ ਖੇਲਤ ਤੇਰੇ ਦੇਹੁਰੇ ਆਇਆ ॥

Laughing and playing, I came to Your Temple, O Lord.

—Guru Granth Sahib, page 1164

ਹਰਿ ਪਾਇਅੜਾ ਵਡਭਾਗੀਈ ਮੇਰੇ ਗੋਵਿੰਦਾ ਨਿਤ ਲੈ ਲਾਹਾ ਮਨਿ ਹਸੁ ਜੀਉ ॥੩॥

By great good fortune, the Lord is found, O my Lord of the Universe; earning profit continually, the mind laughs with joy. ||3||

—Guru Granth Sahib, page 173

ਸਹਜਿ ਬੈਰਾਗੁ ਸਹਜੇ ਹੀ ਹਸਨਾ ॥

In peace and poise, they remain detached; in peace and poise, they laugh.

—Guru Granth Sahib, page 236

=== Dasam Granth ===
There are also references to humour to be found in the Dasam Granth, whose authorship is traditionally attributed to Guru Gobind Singh, some examples are as follows:

ਦਾਮਨੀ ਪ੍ਰਹਾਸਨਿ ਸੁ ਛਬਿ ਨਿਵਾਸਨਿ ਸ੍ਰਿਸਟਿ ਪ੍ਰਕਾਸਨਿ ਗੂੜ੍ਹ ਗਤੇ ॥

You laugh thunderously like lightning, are a denizen of a splendid dwelling, illuminator to the Universe and possessor of profound doctrine.

—Dasam Granth, page 73

Within the Bachitar Natak, another reference can be found that describes how humour can be found in the existence created by the divine:

ਵਾਹੁ ਵਾਹੁ ਕਾ ਬਡਾ ਤਮਾਸਾ ॥
ਆਪੇ ਹਸੈ ਆਪਿ ਹੀ ਚਿਤਵੈ ਆਪੇ ਚੰਦੁ ਸੂਰੁ ਪਰਗਾਸਾ ॥

Waaho! Waaho! Great! Great is the Play of God!
You Yourself think, You Yourself illuminates the sun and the moon; and You Yourself laugh.

—Dasam Granth, page 1403

=== Others ===
In Varan Bhai Gurdas, attributed to Bhai Gurdas Bhalla, there are references to laughter:

ਜੇਹਾ ਮੂੰਹ ਕਰਿ ਭਾਲਿਦਾ ਤੇਵੇਹੈ ਲੇਖੈ॥
ਹਸਦੇ ਹਸਦਾ ਦੇਖੀਐ ਸੋ ਰੂਪ ਸਰੇਖੈ॥

A person is reflected (in the mirror) in exactly the same way as is their propensity.
The laughing person finds a laughing form in it.

—Varan Bhai Gurdas, panna 2
