= Accountant-General of the Federation =

Administrative head of the treasury in Nigeria

- Flag of the Federal Republic of Nigeria
- Incumbent; Oluwatoyin Sakirat Madein
- Style: Mr. Accountant-General
- Member of: Federal Ministry of Finance
- Residence: Treasury House S.L.A Blvd, P.M.B 7015, Garki II, Abuja, FCT, Nigeria
- Appointer: President of Nigeria
- Term length: Four years; renewable
- Constituting instrument: Constitution of Nigeria
- Formation: 1988
- Website: Official website

The Accountant-General of the Federation is the administrative head of the treasury of the Federal Republic of Nigeria. The office holder is often appointed by the President of Nigeria to serve a four years term in accordance with the constitution of the federal republic of Nigeria. The office was established in 1988 under the Civil Services reorganization Decree No. 43 of the constitution of Nigeria.

== Statutory duties ==
The office holder is charged with the responsibility to manage receipts and payments of the Republic of Nigeria and to ensure that a proper system of account exists in every department of the nation's treasury and to exercise general supervision over the receipts of public revenue and over the expenditure of the federal Government.
