= Kobe =

City in Kansai region, Japan

Kobe 神戸市
- Prefecture capital and designated city
- Kobe City
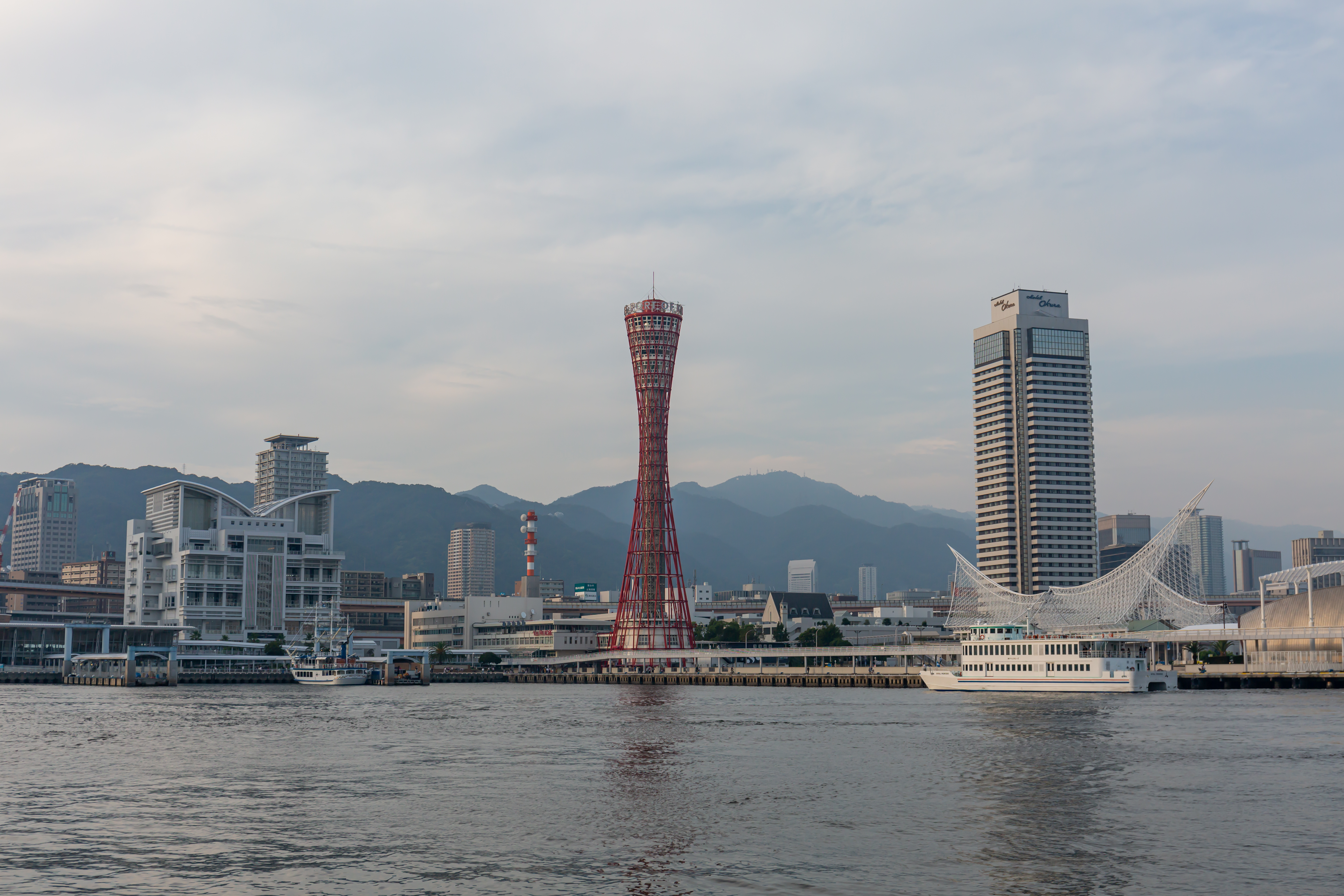
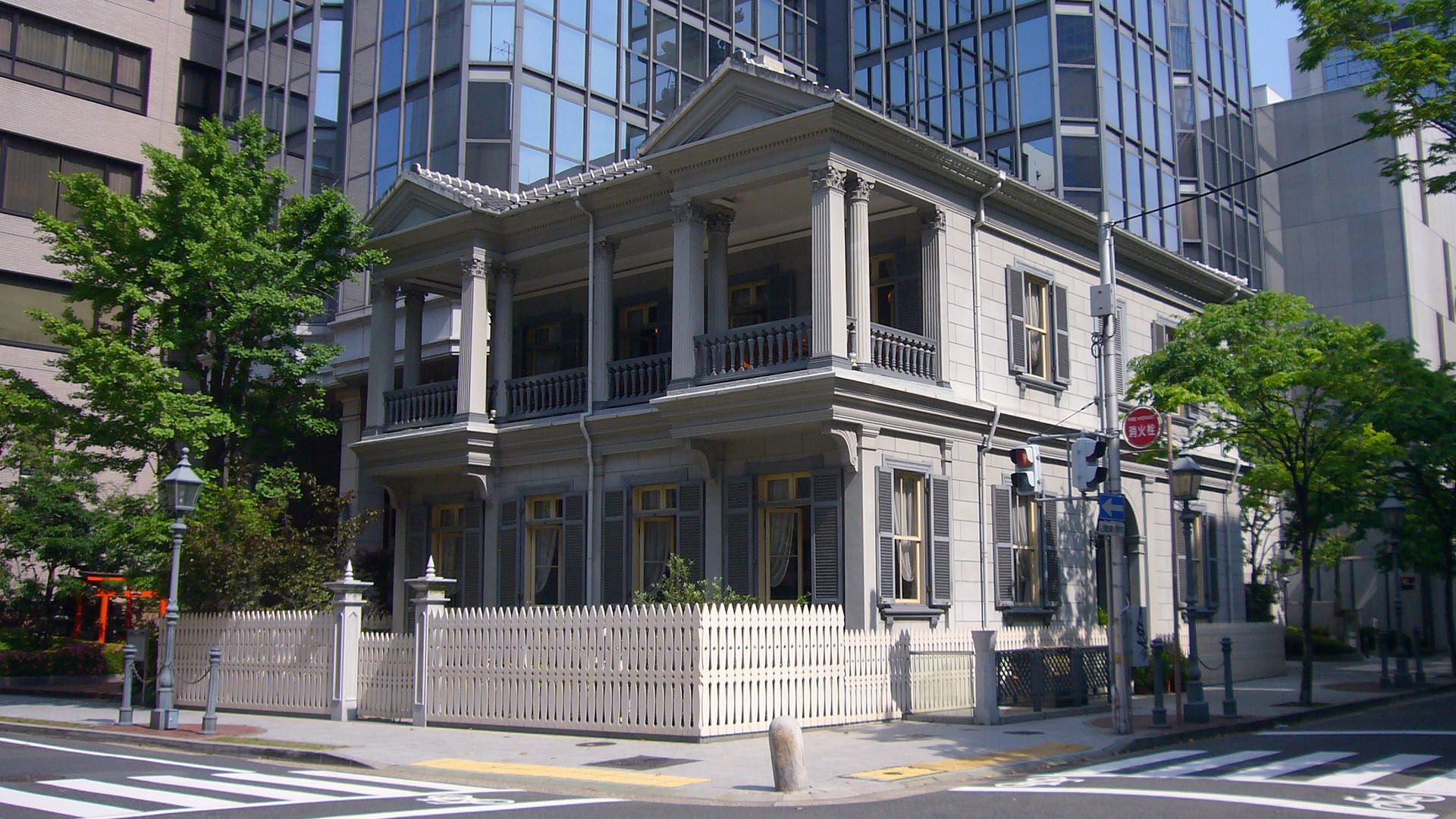
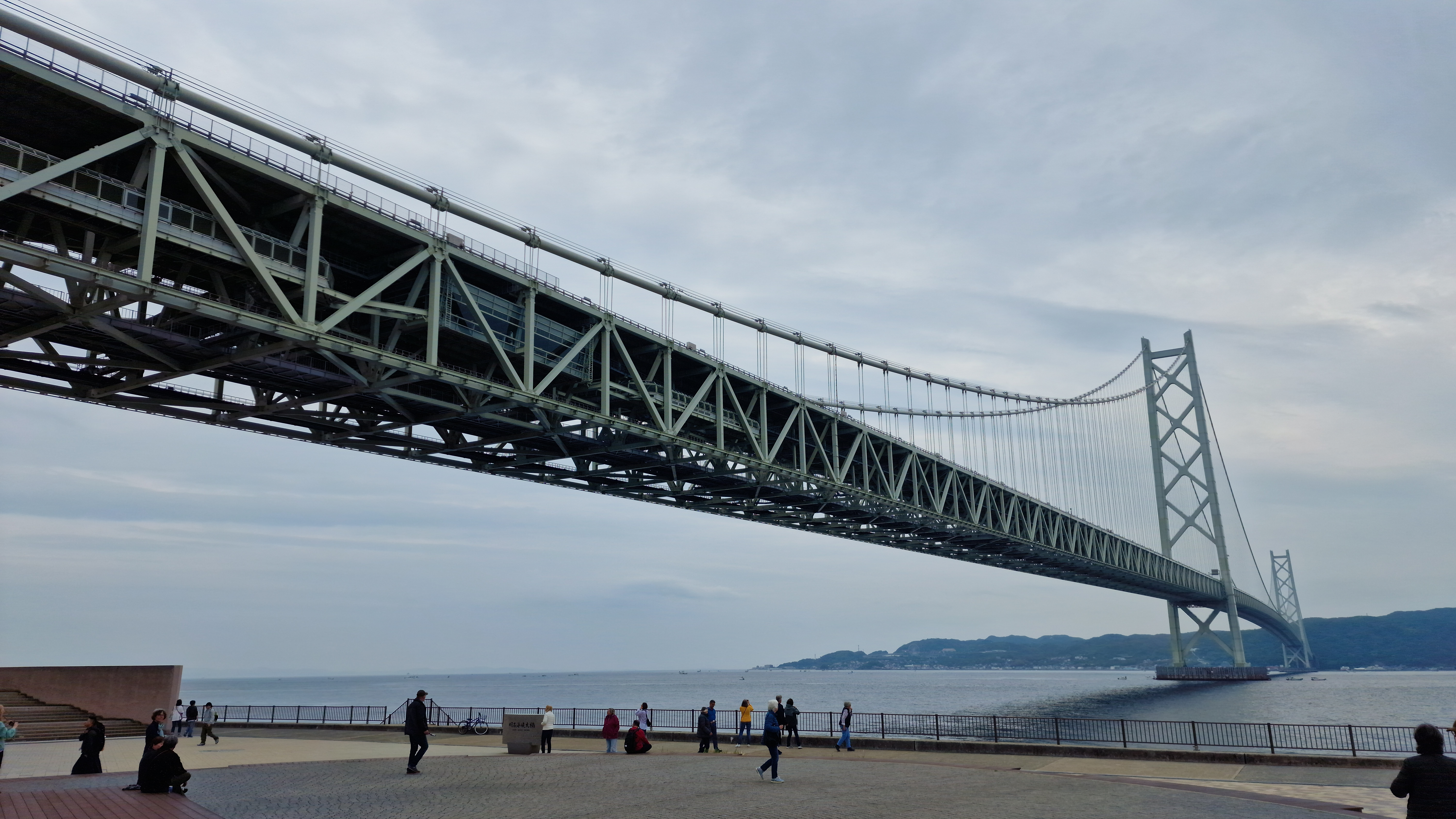
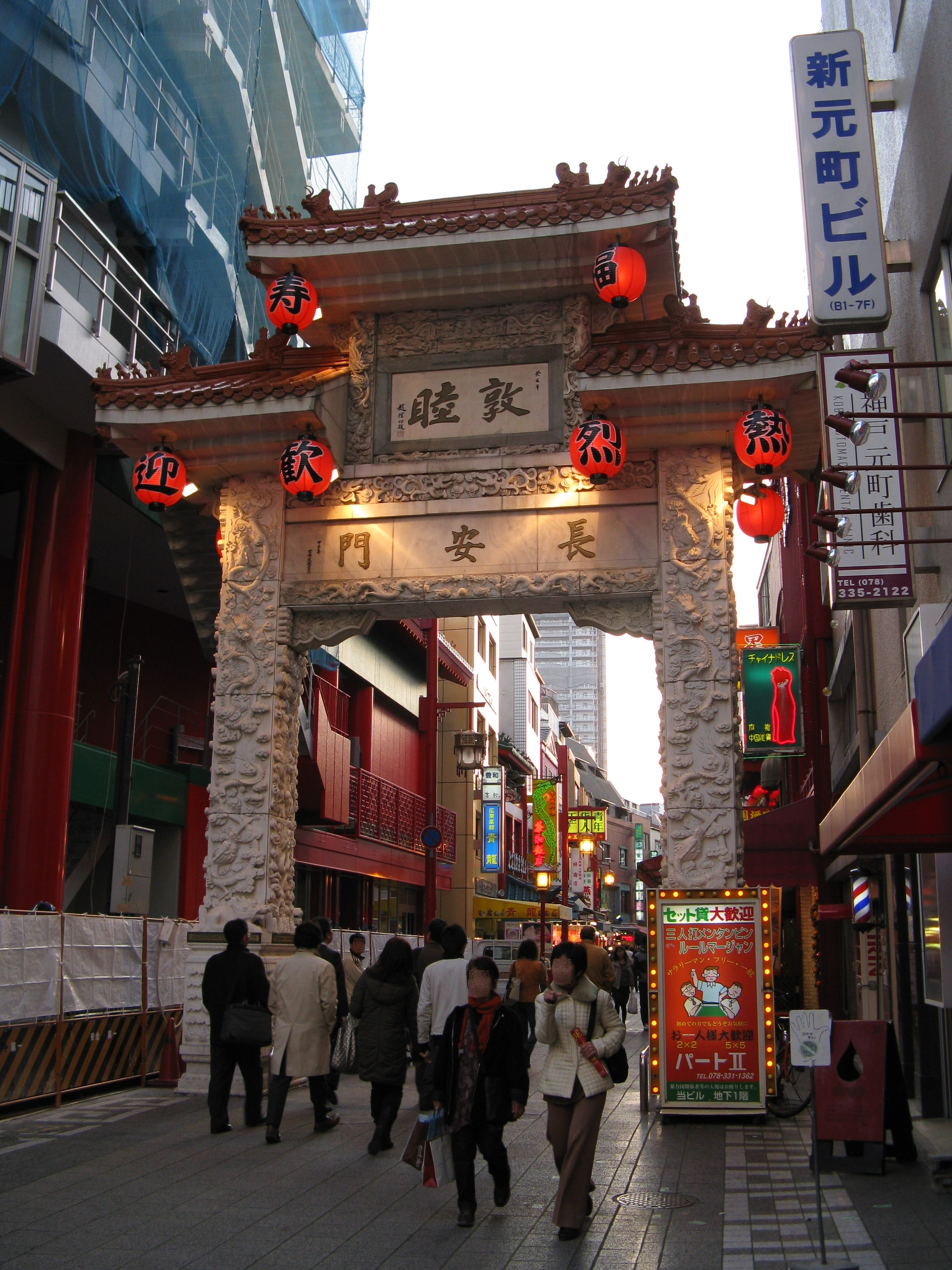
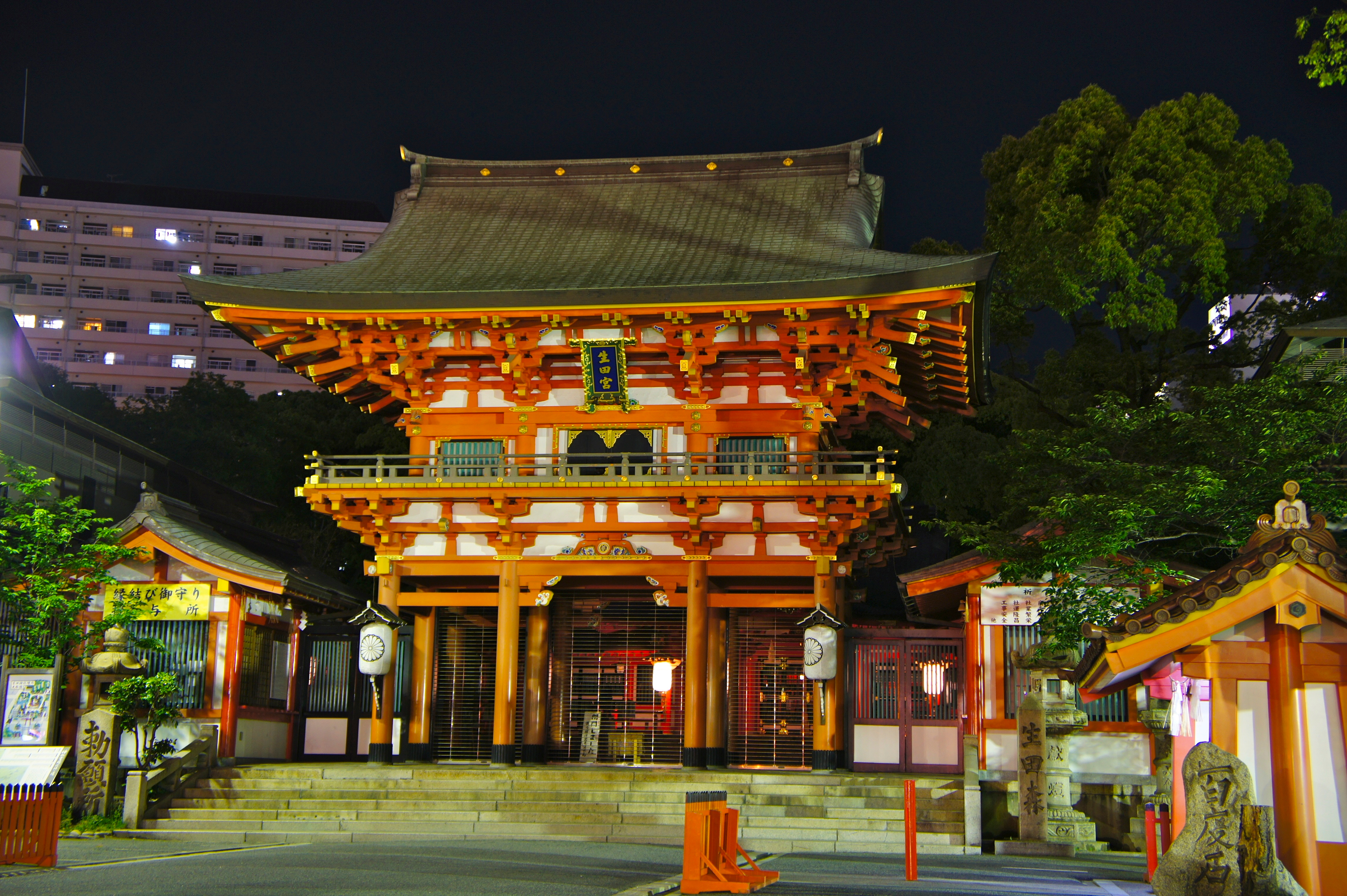
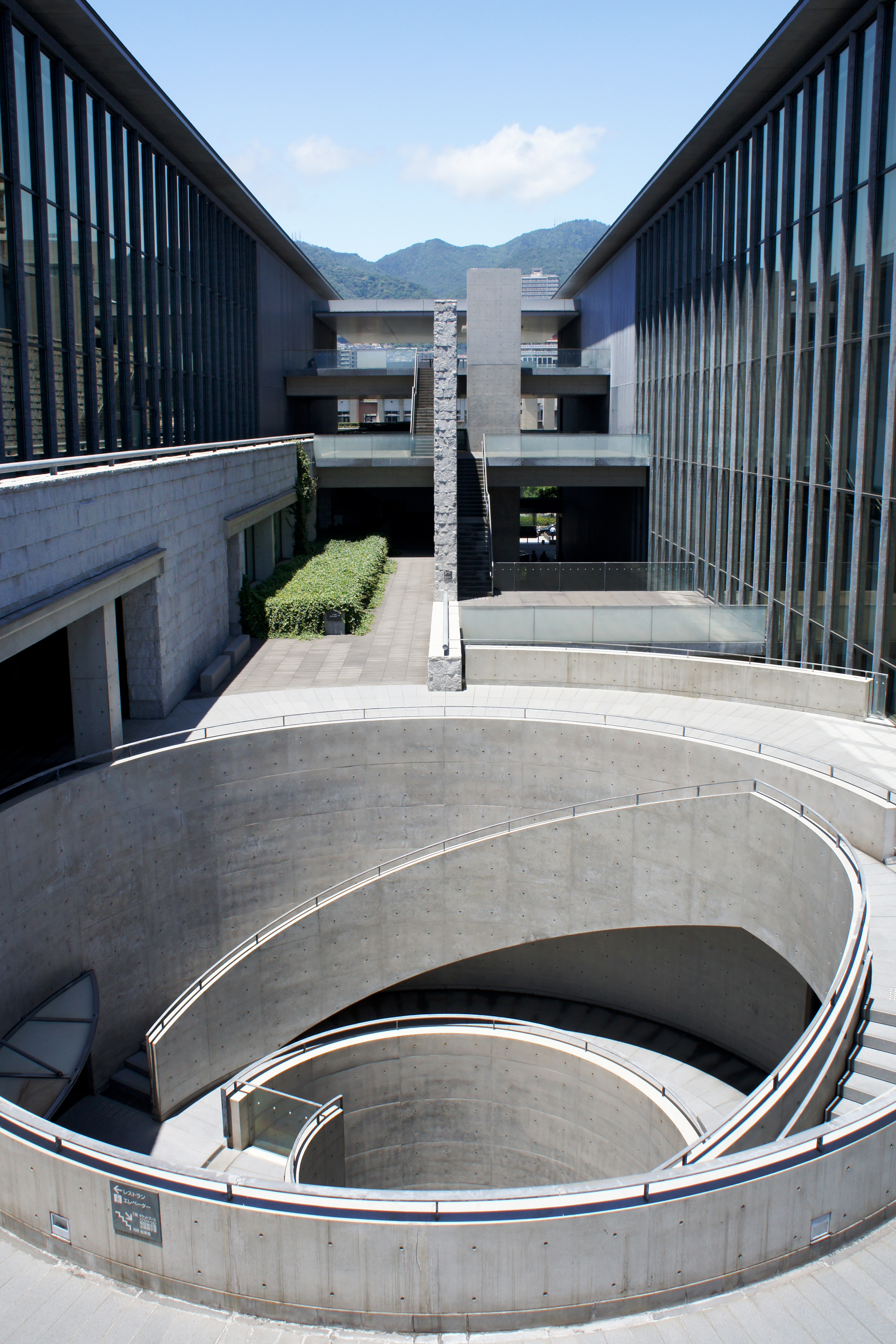
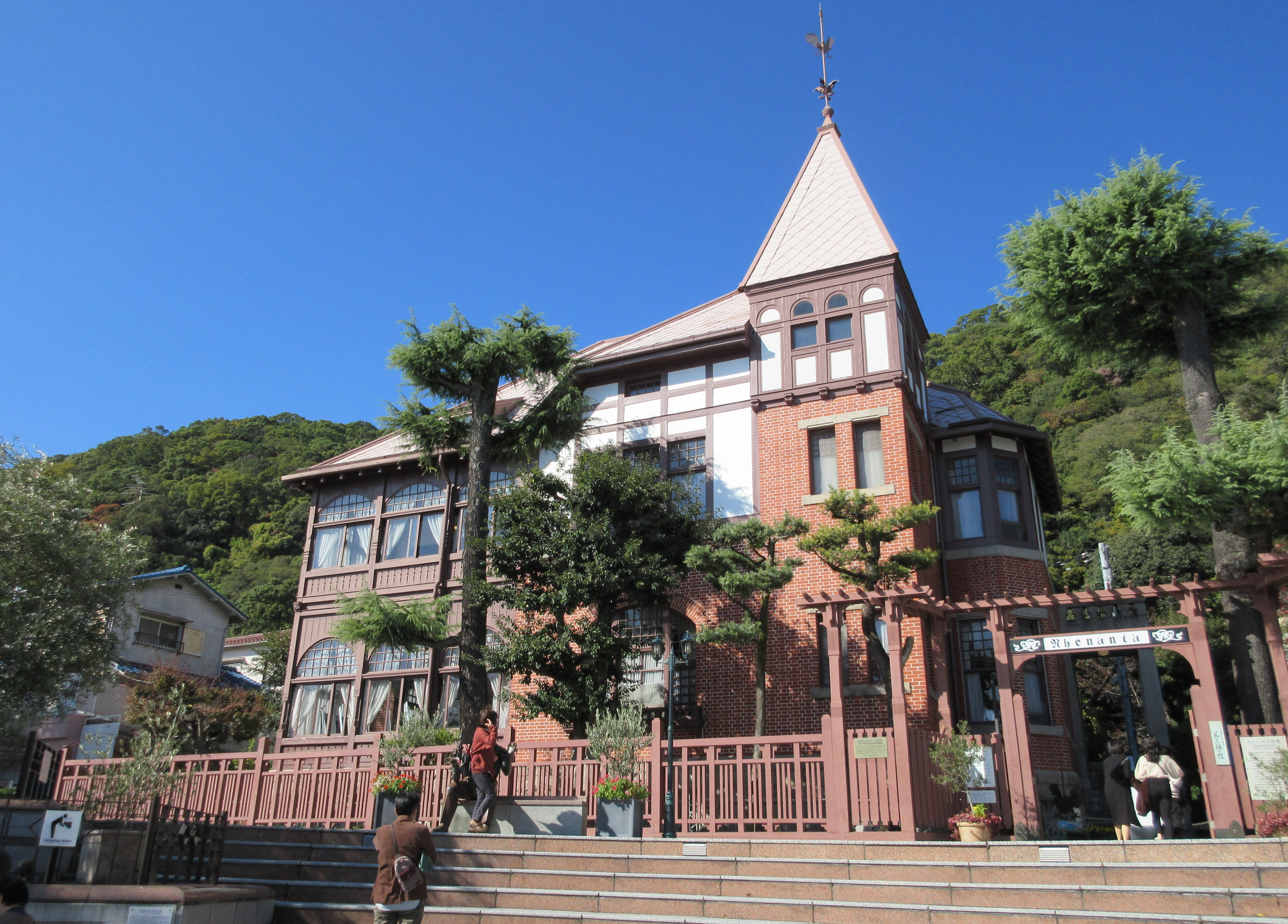
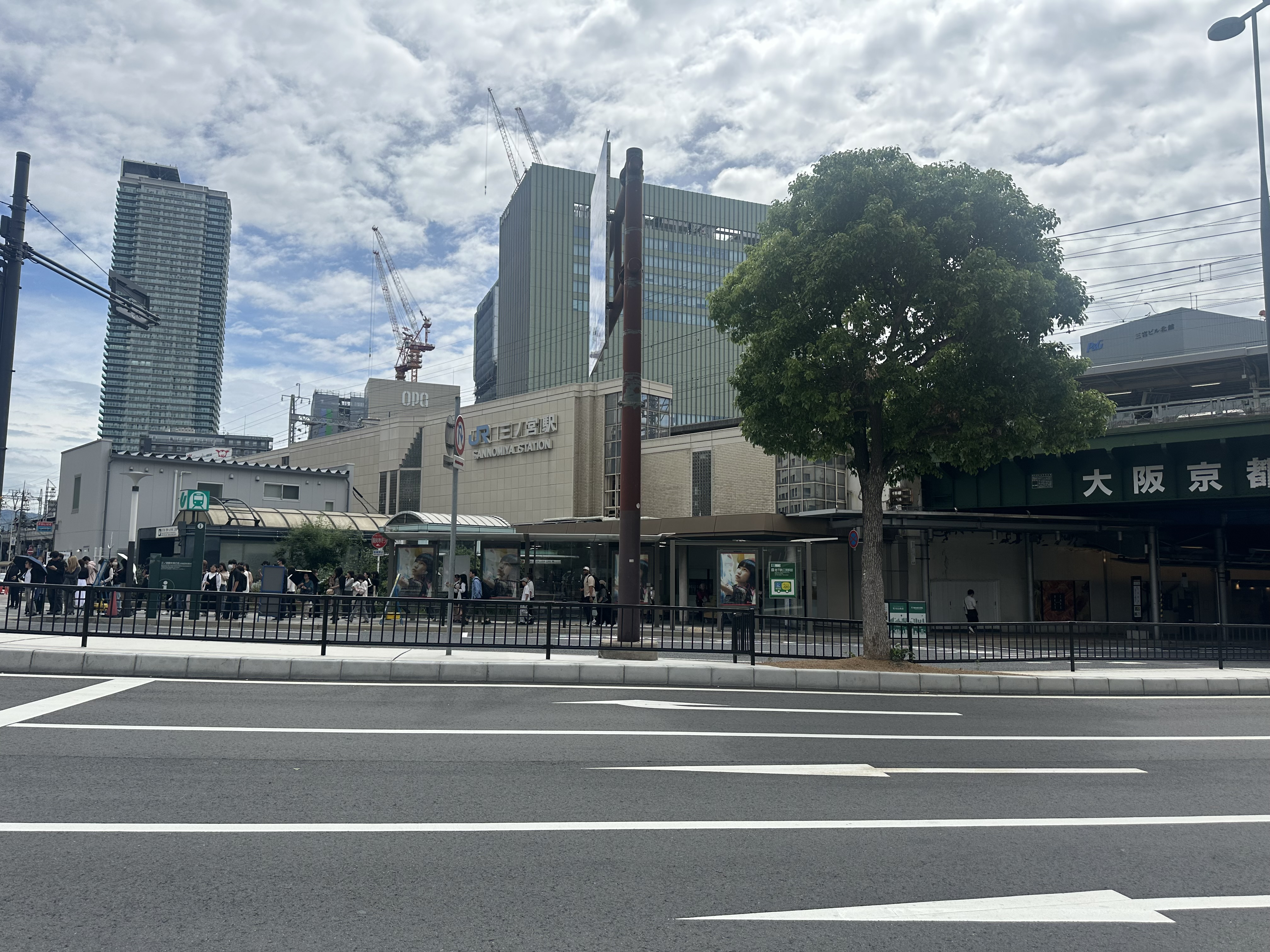
- Kobe Port Tower and Kobe Maritime Museum in Meriken Park Old 15th Hall of the foreign settlement Akashi-Kaikyo Bridge Chinatown in Nankin-machi Ikuta Shrine Hyogo Prefectural Museum of Art Kobe Weathervane House of Kitano-chō Sannomiya

- Flag Seal
- Interactive map outlining Kobe
- Location of Kobe in Hyōgo Prefecture

- Location within Japan
- Coordinates: 34°41′24″N 135°11′44″E
- Country: Japan
- Region: Kansai
- Prefecture: Hyōgo
- First official record: 201 AD
- City Status: April 1, 1889

Government
  - Mayor: Kizō Hisamoto

Area
  - Prefecture capital and designated city: 557.02 km^{2} (215.07 sq mi)

Population (June 1, 2021)
  - Prefecture capital and designated city: 1,522,188 (7th)
  - Density: 2,732.7/km^{2} (7,077.8/sq mi)
  - Metro (2015): 2,419,973 (6th)
- Time zone: UTC+9 (Japan Standard Time)
- Phone number: 078-331-8181
- Address: 6-5-1 Kano-chō, Chūō-ku, Kōbe-shi, Hyōgo-ken; 650-8570
- Climate: Cfa
- Website: City of Kobe
- Symbols
- Flower: Hydrangea
- Tree: Camellia sasanqua

Kobe
- "Kobe" in new-style (shinjitai) kanji

Japanese name
- Kyūjitai: 神戶
- Shinjitai: 神戸
Transcriptions
- Romanization: Kōbe

Kobe (/ˈkoʊˌbeɪ, -i/ KOH-beh, -bee; Japanese: 神戸, romanized: Kōbe, [kó̞ò̞.bè̞]), officially Kobe City (神戸市, Kōbe-shi; [kò̞ó̞.bé̞.ɕì, kó̞ó̞-]), is the capital city of Hyōgo Prefecture, Japan. With a population of around 1.5 million, Kobe is Japan's seventh-largest city and the third-largest port city after Tokyo and Yokohama. It is located in the Kansai region, which makes up the southern side of the main island of Honshū, on the north shore of Osaka Bay. It is part of the Keihanshin metropolitan area along with Osaka and Kyoto. The Kobe city centre is located about 35 km (22 mi) west of Osaka and 70 km (43 mi) southwest of Kyoto.

The earliest written records regarding the region come from the Nihon Shoki, which describes the founding of the Ikuta Shrine by Empress Jingū in AD 201. For most of its history, the area was never a single political entity, even during the Tokugawa period, when the port was controlled directly by the Tokugawa shogunate. Kobe did not exist in its current form until its founding in 1889. Its name comes from Kanbe (神戸; an archaic title for supporters of the city's Ikuta Shrine). Kobe became one of Japan's designated cities in 1956.

Kobe was one of the cities to open for trade with the West following the 1853 end of the policy of seclusion and has retained its cosmopolitan character ever since with a rich architectural heritage dating back to the Meiji era. While the 1995 Great Hanshin earthquake diminished some of Kobe's prominence as a port city, it remains Japan's fourth-busiest container port. Companies headquartered in Kobe include ASICS, Kawasaki Heavy Industries, and Kobe Steel, while over 100 international corporations have their Asian or Japanese headquarters in the city, including Eli Lilly and Company, Procter & Gamble, Boehringer Ingelheim, and Nestlé. The city is the point of origin and namesake of Kobe beef, the home of Kobe University, and the site of one of Japan's most famous hot spring resorts, Arima Onsen.

== History ==
=== Origins ===
Tools found in western Kobe demonstrate that the area was populated at least from the Jōmon period.

The natural geography of the area, particularly of Wada Cape in Hyōgo-ku, led to the development of a port, which has remained the economic center of the city. Some of the earliest written documents mentioning the region include the Nihon Shoki, which describes the founding of the Ikuta Shrine by Empress Jingū in AD 201.

Gallery

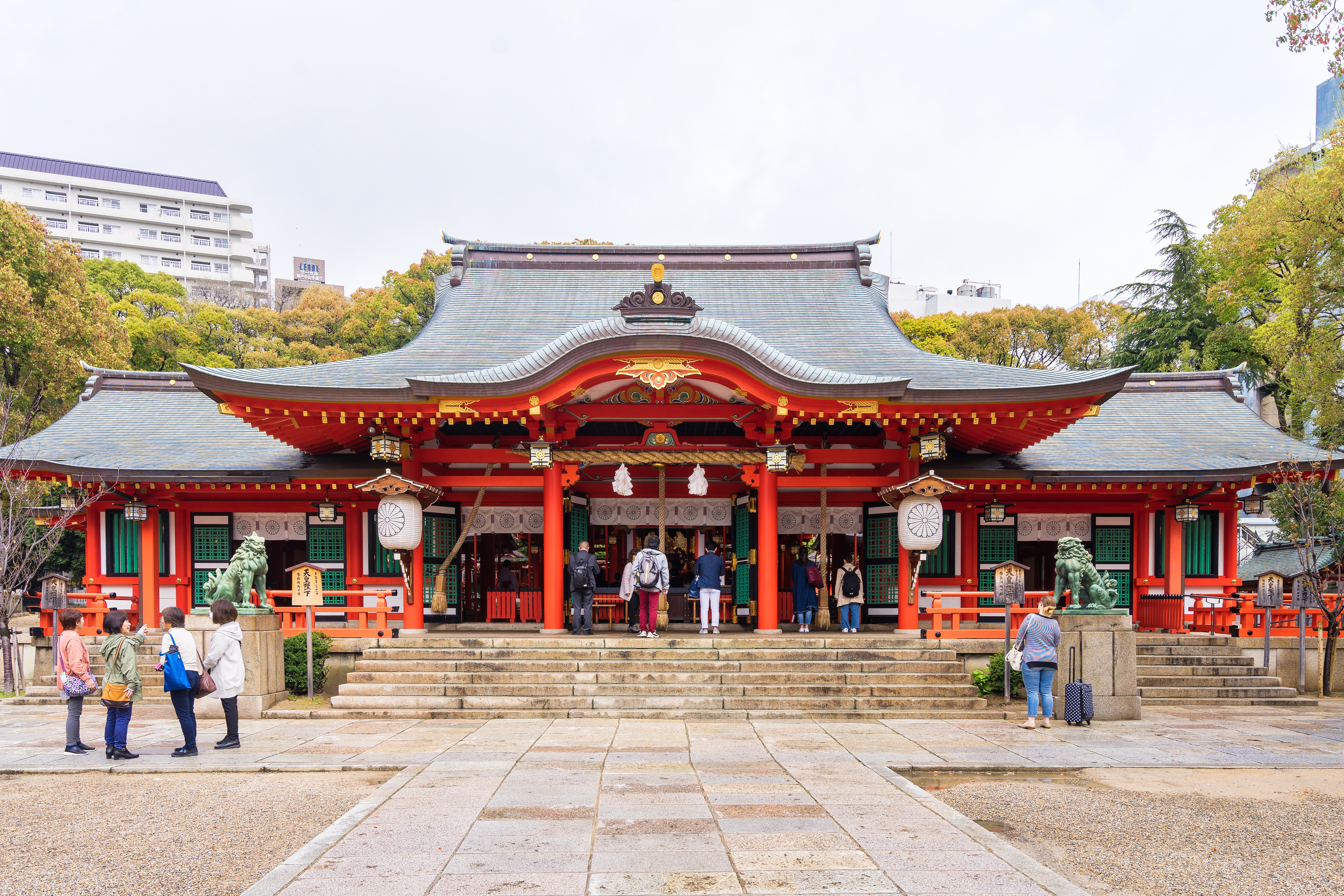
Ikuta Shrine

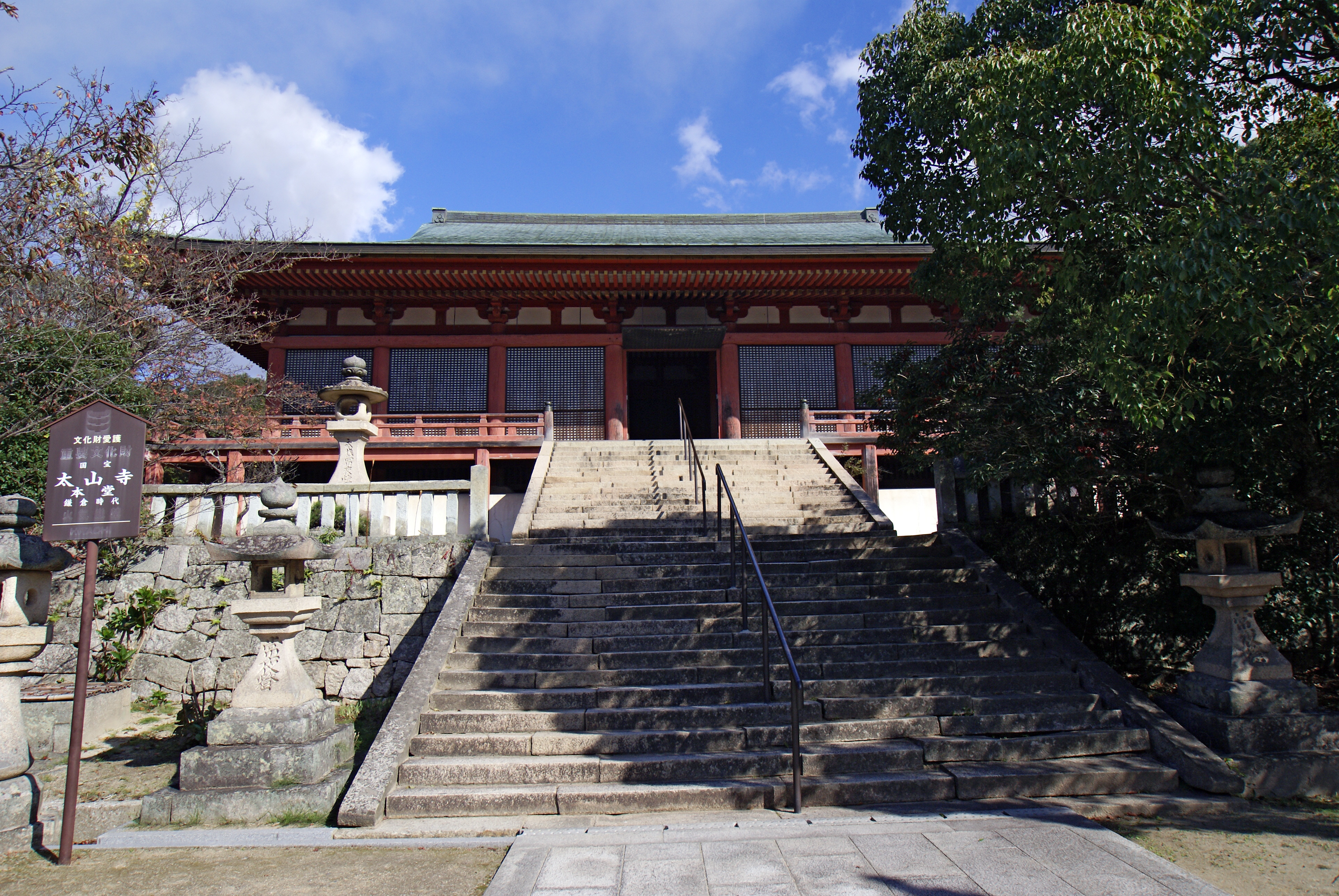
Taisan-ji. The main hall is a National Treasure of Japan (built in 716).

=== Nara and Heian periods ===
During the Nara and Heian periods, the port was known by the name Ōwada Anchorage (Ōwada-no-tomari) and was one of the ports from which imperial embassies to China were dispatched. The city was briefly the capital of Japan in 1180, when Taira no Kiyomori moved his grandson Emperor Antoku to Fukuhara-kyō in present-day Hyōgo-ku. The Emperor returned to Kyoto after about five months. Shortly thereafter in 1184, the Taira fortress in Hyōgo-ku and the nearby Ikuta Shrine became the sites of the Genpei War battle of Ichi-no-Tani between the Taira and Minamoto clans. The Minamoto prevailed, forcing Taira remnants to flee to Shikoku.

Gallery

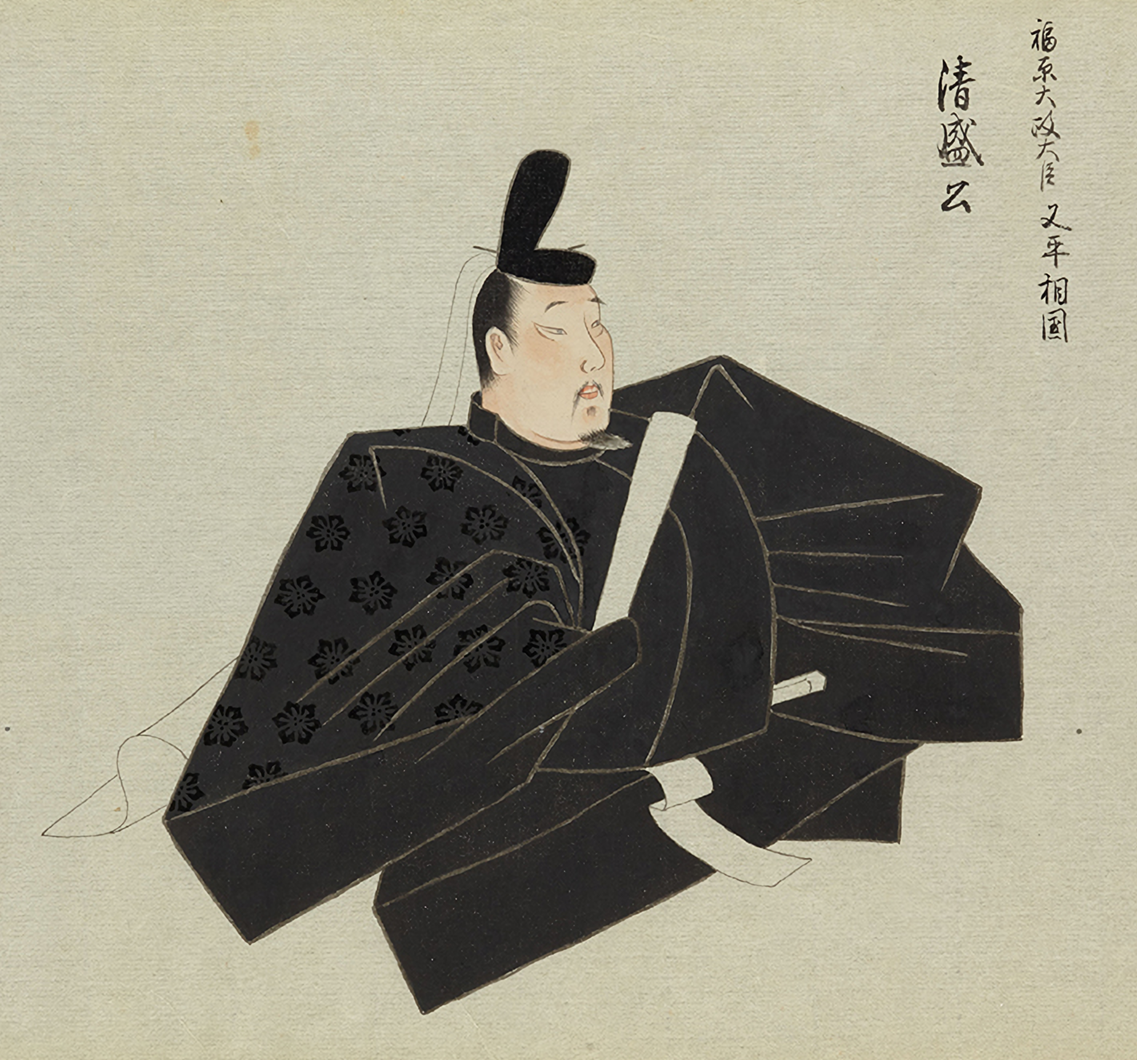
Taira no Kiyomori

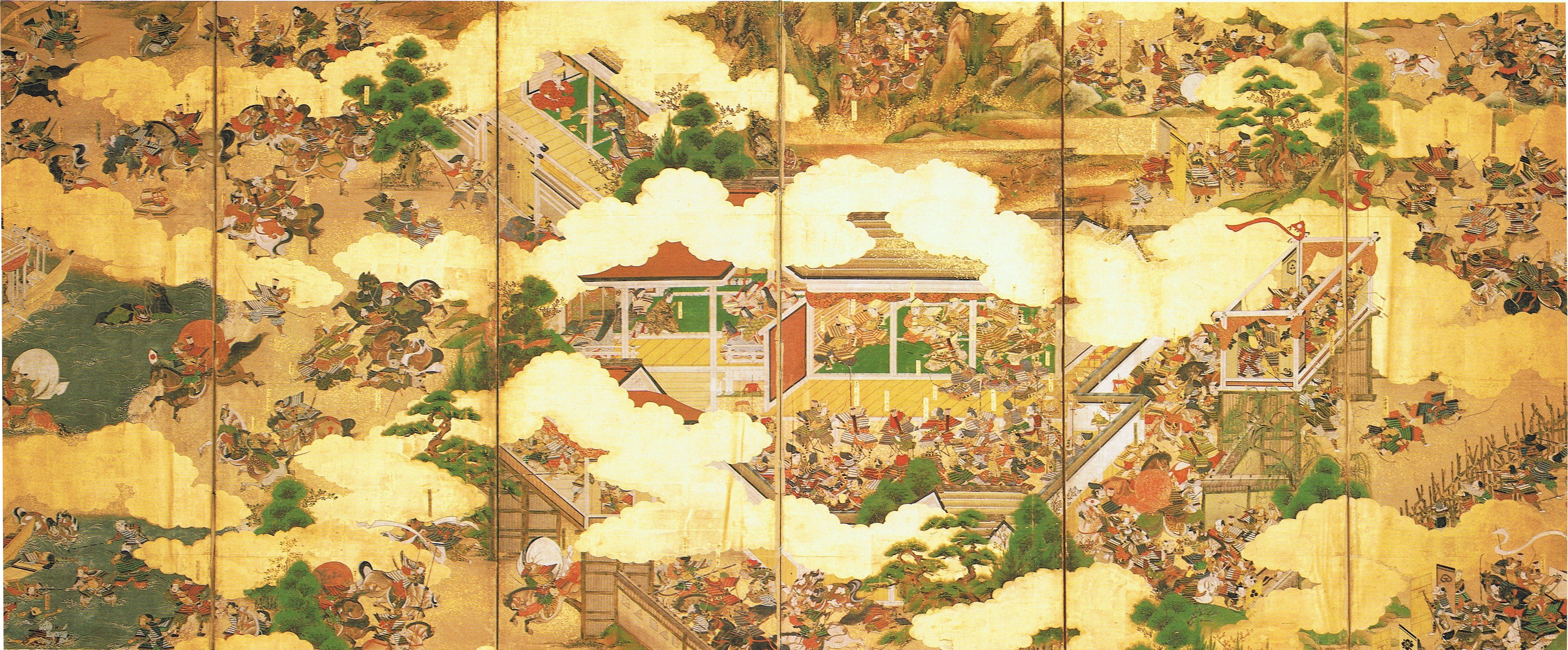
Battle of Ichi-no-Tani (Genpei War)

=== Kamakura period ===
As the port grew during the Kamakura period, it became an important hub for trade with China and other countries. In the 13th century, the city came to be known by the name Hyōgo Port (兵庫津, Hyōgo-tsu). During this time, Hyōgo Port, along with northern Osaka, composed the province of Settsu (most of today's Kobe belonged to Settsu except Nishi Ward and Tarumi Ward, which belonged to Harima).

Gallery

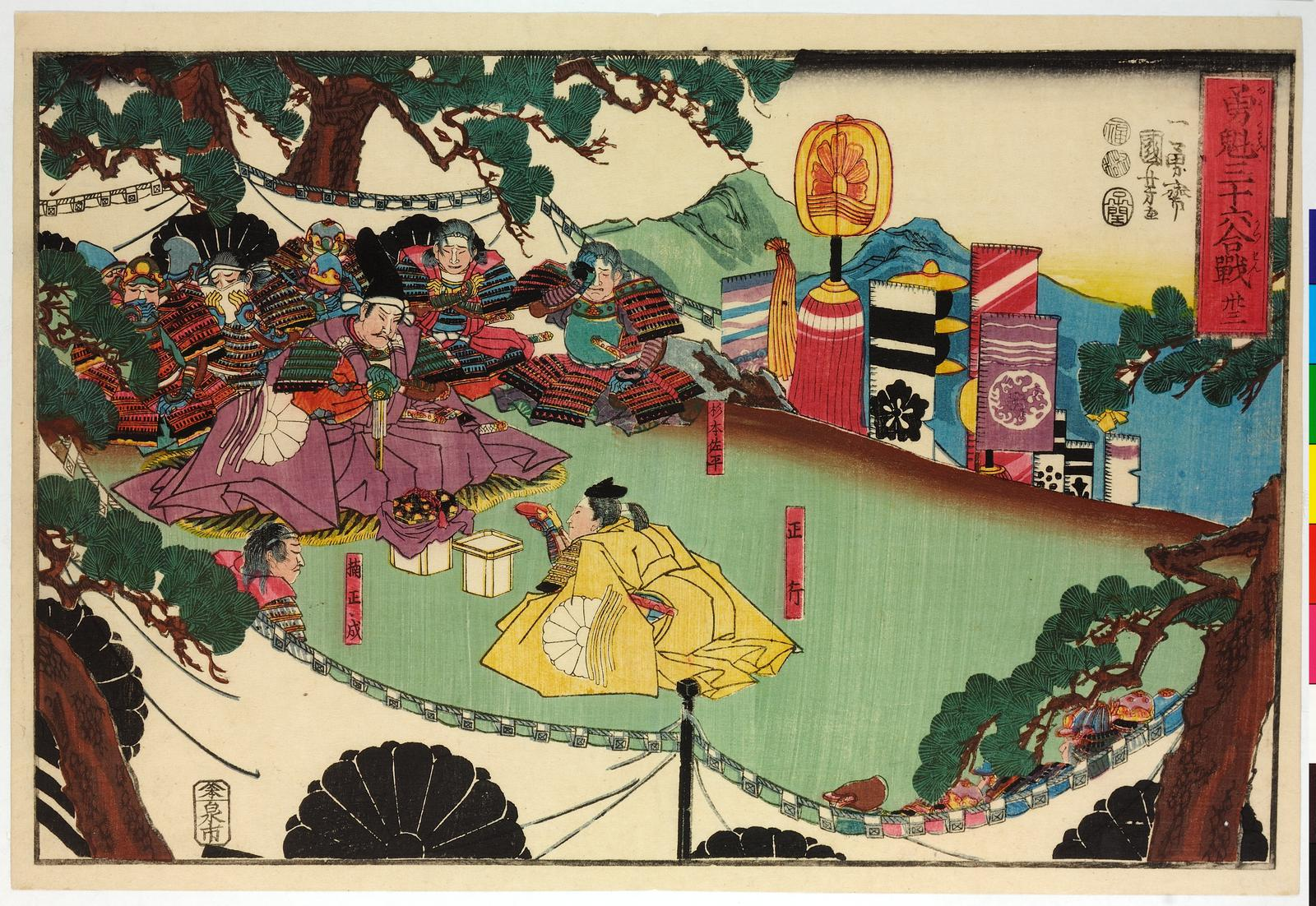
Kusunoki Masashige (Battle of Minatogawa)

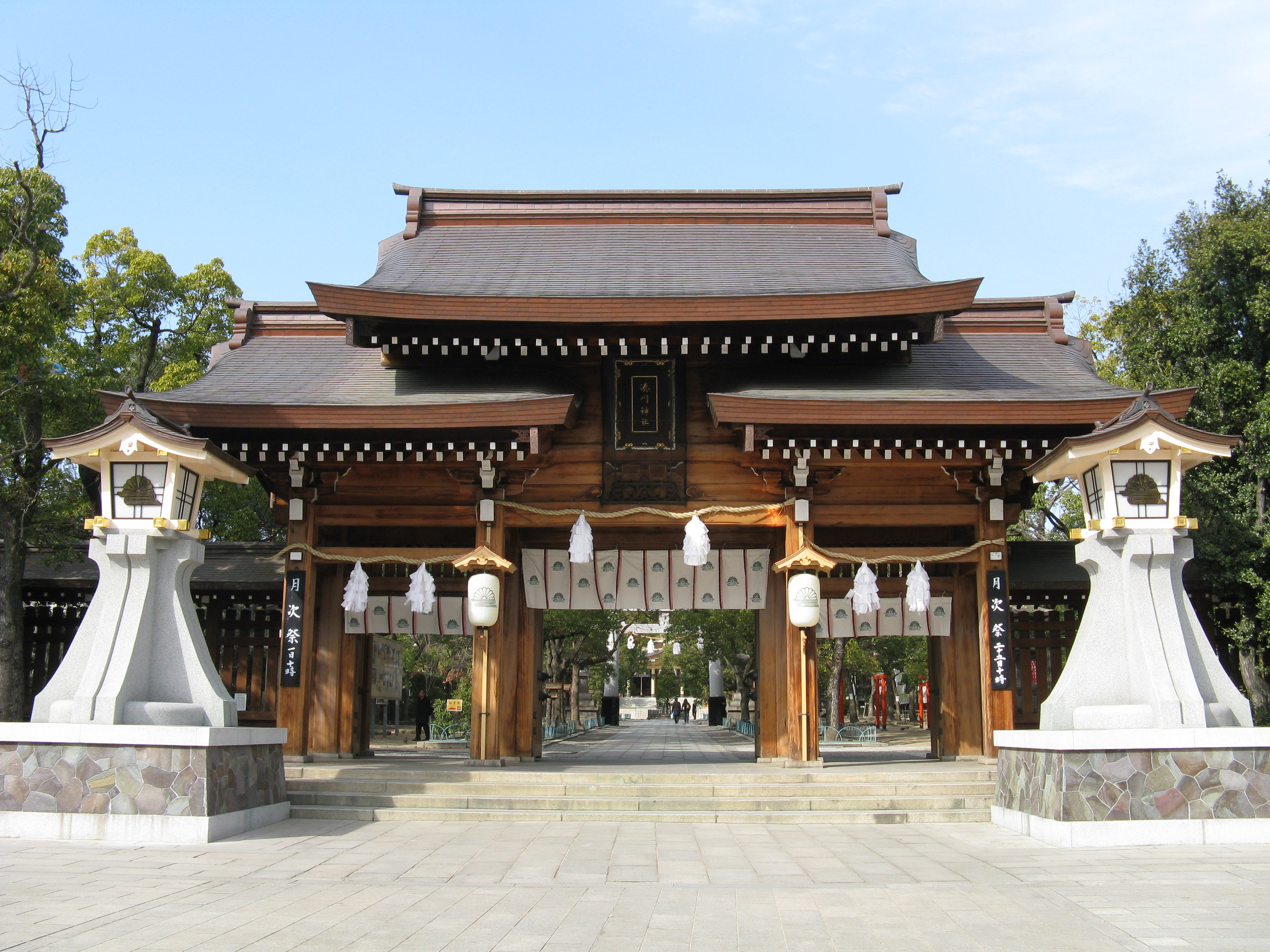
Minatogawa Shrine

=== Edo period ===
Later, during the Edo period, the eastern parts of present-day Kobe came under the jurisdiction of the Amagasaki Domain and the western parts under that of the Akashi Domain, while the center was controlled directly by the Tokugawa shogunate. It was not until the abolition of the han system in 1871 and the establishment of the current prefecture system that the area became politically distinct.

=== Meiji period ===
Hyōgo Port was opened to foreign trade by the Shogunal government at the same time as Osaka on January 1, 1868, just before the advent of the Boshin War and the Meiji Restoration. At the time of the opening of the city for foreign trade, the area saw intense fighting resulting from the civil war in progress. Shortly after the opening of Kobe to trade, the Kobe Incident occurred, where several western soldiers sustained wounds from gunfire by troops from Bizen. The region has since been identified with the West and many foreign residences from the period remain in Kobe's Kitano area.

Gallery

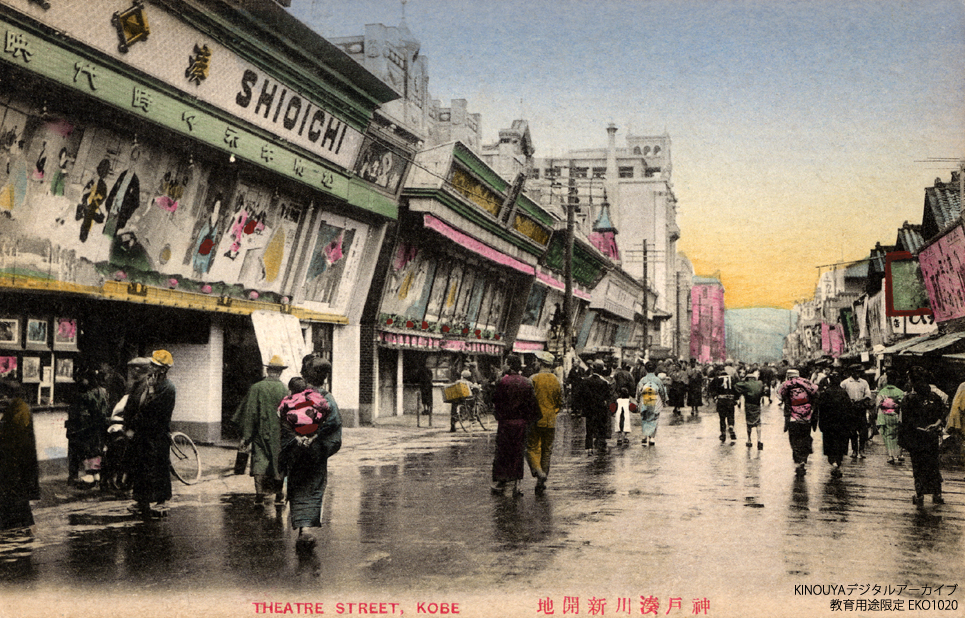
Shinkaichi theatre street in Kobe (Taisho era)

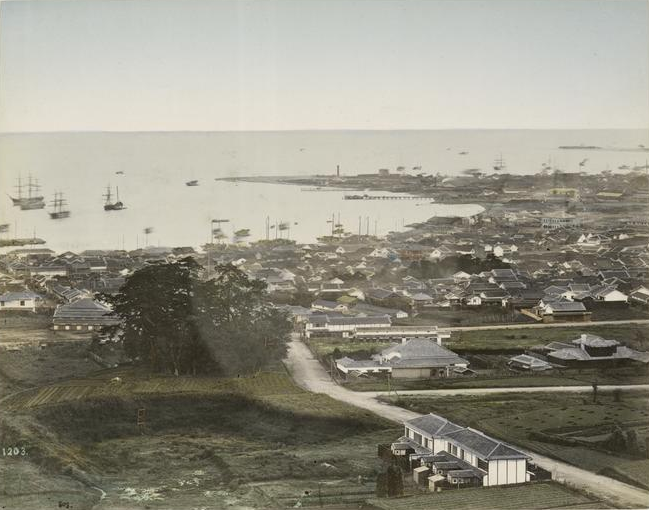
Hyōgo Port in the 19th century

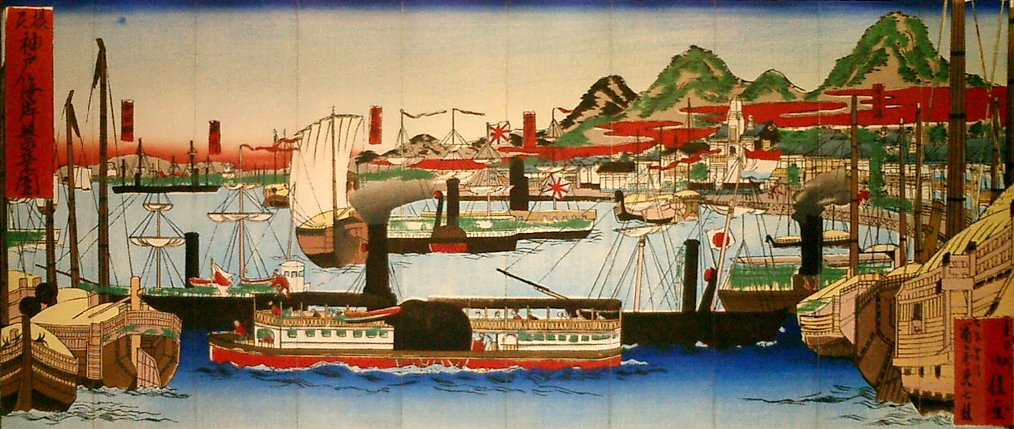
This nishiki-e (colored woodcut) shows a foreign steamboat entering Hyōgo Port shortly after its opening to the West in the late 19th century.

=== Modern era ===
Kobe, as it is known today, was founded on April 1, 1889, and was designated on September 1, 1956 by government ordinance. The history of the city is closely tied to that of the Ikuta Shrine, and the name "Kobe" derives from kamube (神戸; later kanbe), an archaic name for those who supported the shrine.

During World War II, Kobe was lightly bombed in the Doolittle Raid on April 18, 1942, along with Tokyo and a few other cities. Eventually, it was bombed again with incendiary bombs by B-29 Superfortress bombers on March 16 and 17, 1945, causing the death of 8,841 residents and the destruction of 21% of Kobe's urban area. This incident inspired the well-known Studio Ghibli film Grave of the Fireflies and the book by Akiyuki Nosaka on which the film was based. It also features in the motion picture A Boy Called H.

Following continuous pressure from citizens, on March 18, 1975, the Kobe City Council passed an ordinance banning vessels carrying nuclear weapons from Kobe Port. This effectively prevented any U.S. warships from entering the port, because U.S. policy is to never disclose whether any given warship is carrying nuclear weapons. This nonproliferation policy has been termed the "Kobe formula".

On January 17, 1995, a magnitude 6.9 earthquake occurred at 5:46 am JST near the city. About 6,434 people in the city were killed, 212,443 were made homeless, and large parts of the port facilities and other parts of the city were destroyed. The earthquake destroyed portions of the Hanshin Expressway, an elevated freeway that dramatically toppled over. In Japan, this earthquake is known as the Great Hanshin earthquake (or the Hanshin-Awaji earthquake). To commemorate Kobe's recovery from it, the city holds an event every December called the Luminarie, where the city center is decorated with illuminated metal archways.

The Port of Kobe was Japan's busiest port and one of Asia's top ports until the Great Hanshin earthquake. Kobe later dropped to fourth in Japan and, as of 2025, was the 72nd-busiest container port worldwide, as ranked by Lloyds.

Gallery

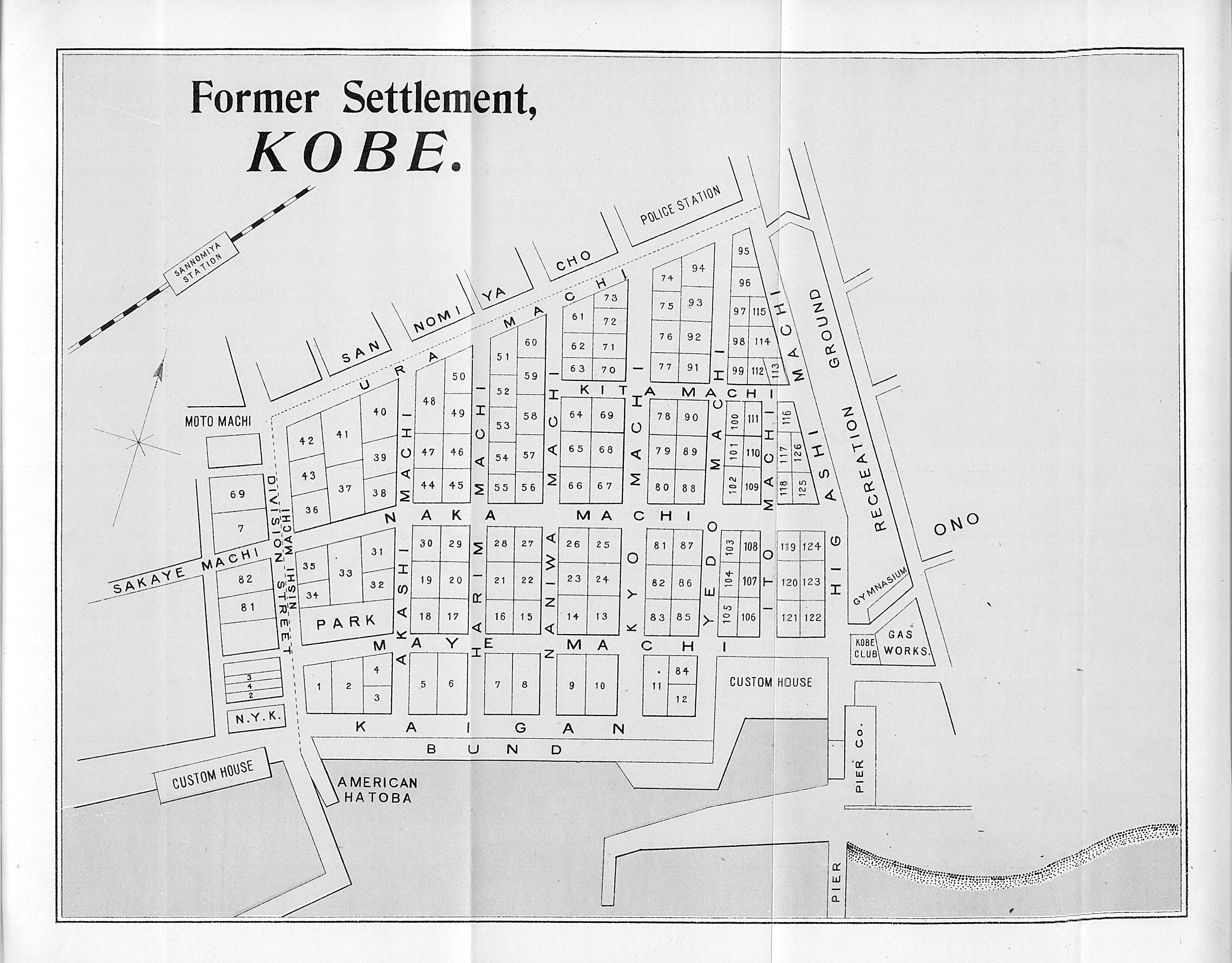
Map of the Foreign Settlement

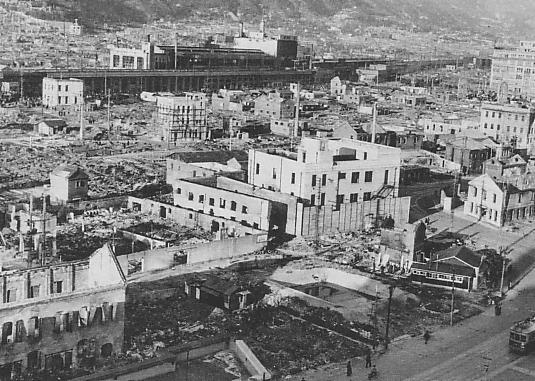
View of Kobe after the bombing in 1945

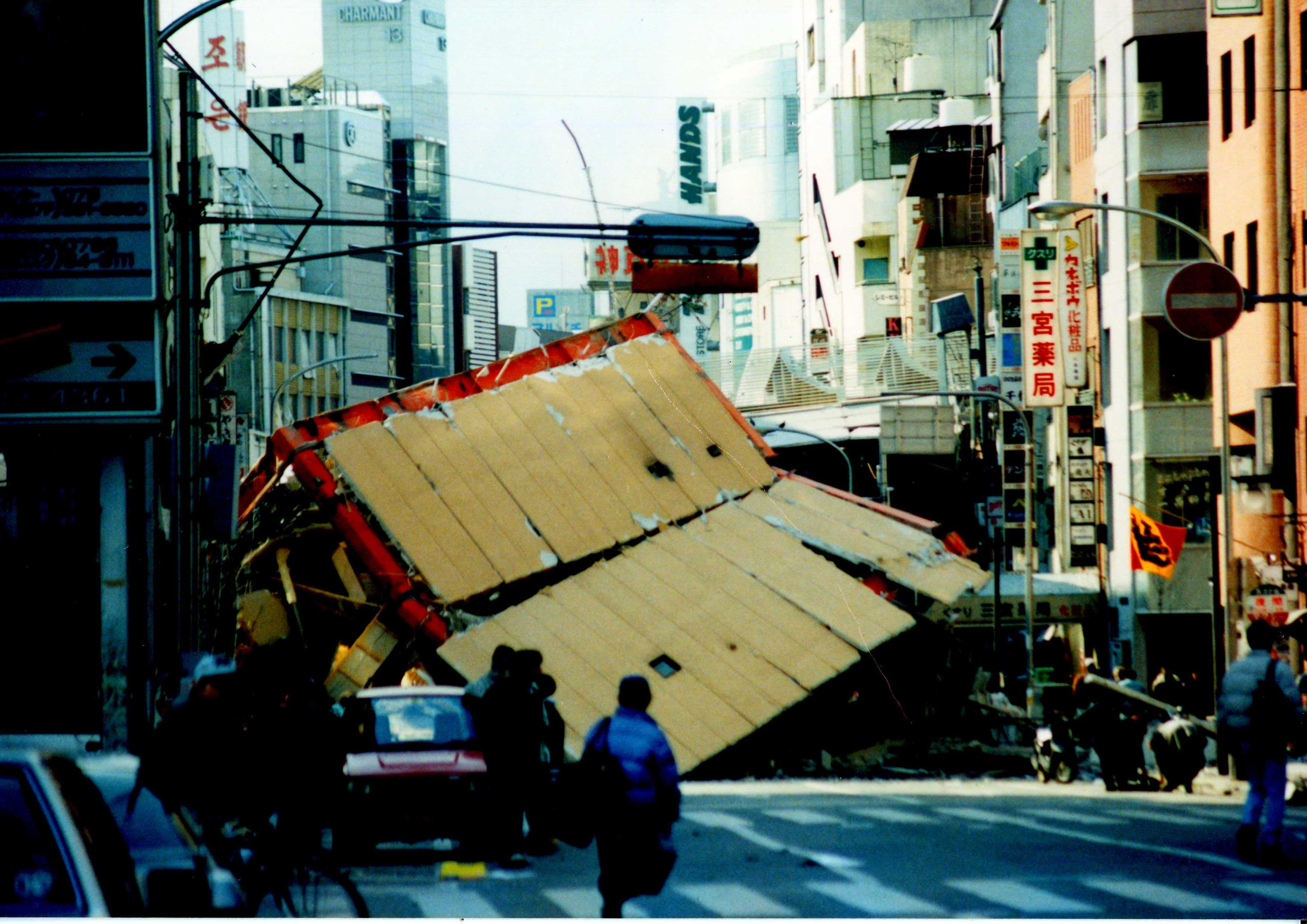
Damage in Sannomiya after the Great Hanshin earthquake in 1995

== Geography ==
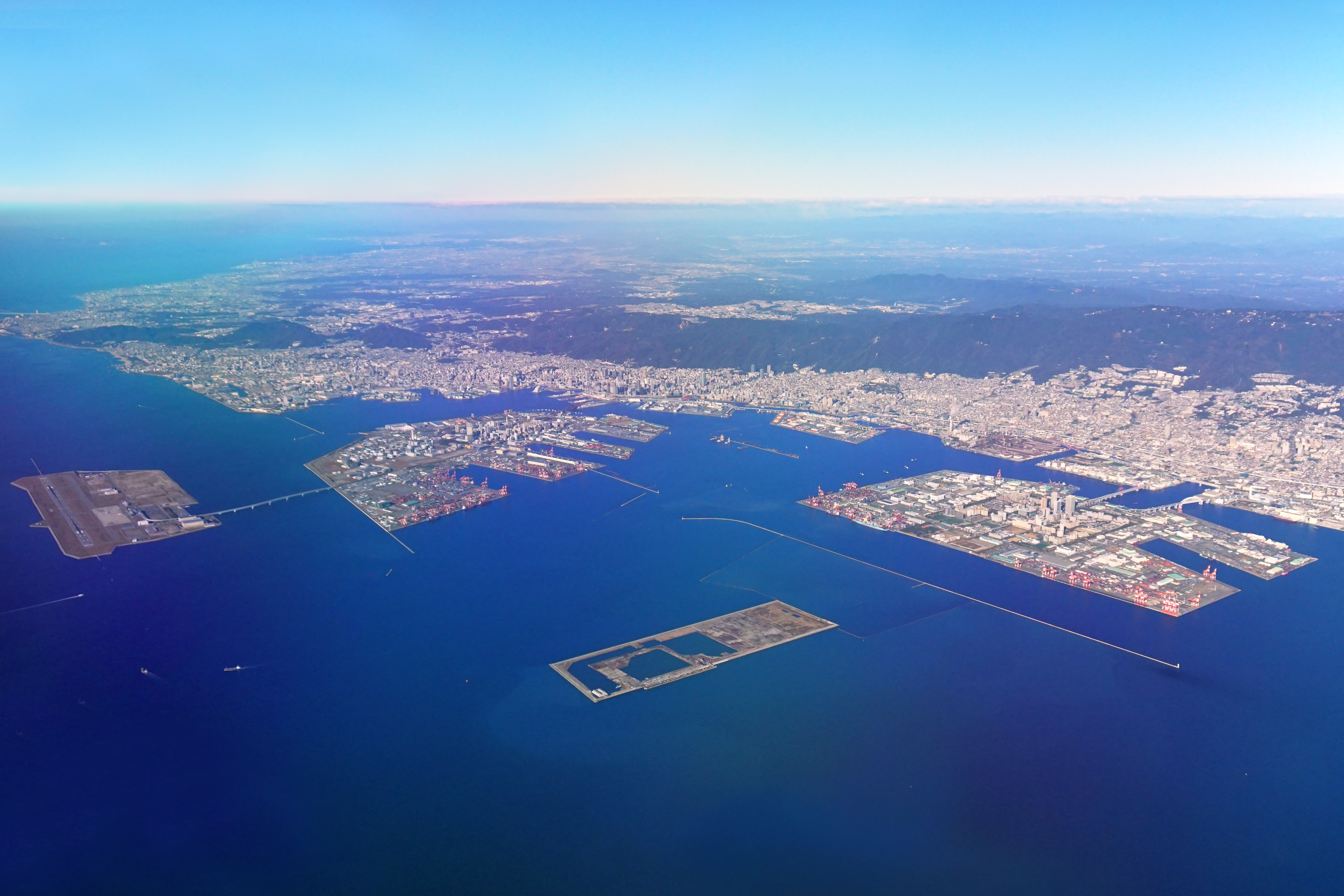
View of Kobe from an airplane

Wedged between the coast and the mountains, the city of Kobe is long and narrow. To the east is the city of Ashiya, while the city of Akashi lies to its west. Other adjacent cities include Takarazuka and Nishinomiya to the east and Sanda and Miki to the north.

The landmark of the port area is the red steel Port Tower. A ferris wheel sits in nearby Harborland, a notable tourist promenade. Two artificial islands, Port Island and Rokkō Island, have been constructed to give the city room to expand.

Away from the seaside at the heart of Kobe lie the Motomachi and Sannomiya districts, as well as Kobe's Chinatown, Nankin-machi, all well-known retail areas. A multitude of train lines cross the city from east to west. The main transport hub is Sannomiya Station, with the eponymous Kobe Station located to the west and the Shinkansen Shin-Kobe Station to the north.

Mount Rokkō overlooks Kobe at an elevation of 931 m (3,054 ft). During autumn, it is famous for the rich change in colors of its forests.

A panorama of Kobe, its harbor, and Port Island from Kobe Port Tower

=== Wards ===
Kobe has nine wards (ku):

1. Nishi-ku: The westernmost area of Kobe, Nishi-ku overlooks the city of Akashi and is the site of Kobe Gakuin University. This ward has the largest population, with 247,000 residents.
2. Kita-ku: Kita-ku is the largest ward by area and contains the Rokko Mountain Range, including Mount Rokkō and Mount Maya. The area is well known for its rugged landscape and hiking trails. The onsen resort town of Arima also lies within Kita-ku.
3. Tarumi-ku: Tarumi-ku is a mostly residential area. The second-longest suspension bridge in the world, the Akashi Kaikyō Bridge, extends from Maiko in Tarumi-ku to Awaji Island to the south. A relatively new addition to Kobe, Tarumi-ku was not a part of the city until 1946.
4. Suma-ku: Suma-ku is the site of Suma beach, attracting visitors during the summer months.
5. Nagata-ku: Nagata-ku is the site of Nagata Shrine, one of the three "Great Shrines" in Kobe.
6. Hyōgo-ku: At various times known as Ōwada Anchorage or Hyōgo Port, this area is the historical heart of the city. Shinkaichi in Hyogo-ku was once the commercial center of Kobe, but was heavily damaged during World War II, and since, Hyogo-ku has lost much of its former prominence.
7. Chūō-ku: Chūō (中央) literally means "central" and, as such, Chūō-ku is the commercial and entertainment center of Kobe. Sannomiya, Motomachi and Harborland make up the main entertainment areas in Kobe. Chūō-ku includes the city hall and Hyōgo prefectural government offices. Port Island and Kobe Airport lie in the southern part of this ward.
8. Nada-ku: The site of Oji Zoo and Kobe University, Nada is known for its sake. Along with Fushimi in Kyoto, it accounts for 45% of Japan's sake production.
9. Higashinada-ku: The easternmost area of Kobe, Higashinada-ku borders the city of Ashiya. The man-made island of Rokko makes up the southern part of this ward.

Wards of Kobe
	Place Name					Map of Kobe
	Rōmaji	Kanji	Population	Land area in km^{2}	Pop. density per km2	
1	Nishi-ku	西区	240,386	138.01	1,742	A map of Kobe's Wards
2	Kita-ku	北区	212,211	240.29	883	A map of Kobe's Wards
3	Tarumi-ku	垂水区	216,337	28.11	7,696	A map of Kobe's Wards
4	Suma-ku	須磨区	158,196	28.93	5,468	A map of Kobe's Wards
5	Nagata-ku	長田区	95,155	11.36	8,376	A map of Kobe's Wards
6	Hyōgo-ku	兵庫区	107,307	14.68	7,310	A map of Kobe's Wards
7	Chūō-ku	中央区	142,232	28.97	4,910	A map of Kobe's Wards
8	Nada-ku	灘区	136,865	32.66	4,191	A map of Kobe's Wards
9	Higashinada-ku	東灘区	214,255	34.02	6,298	A map of Kobe's Wards

=== Cityscape ===
Gallery

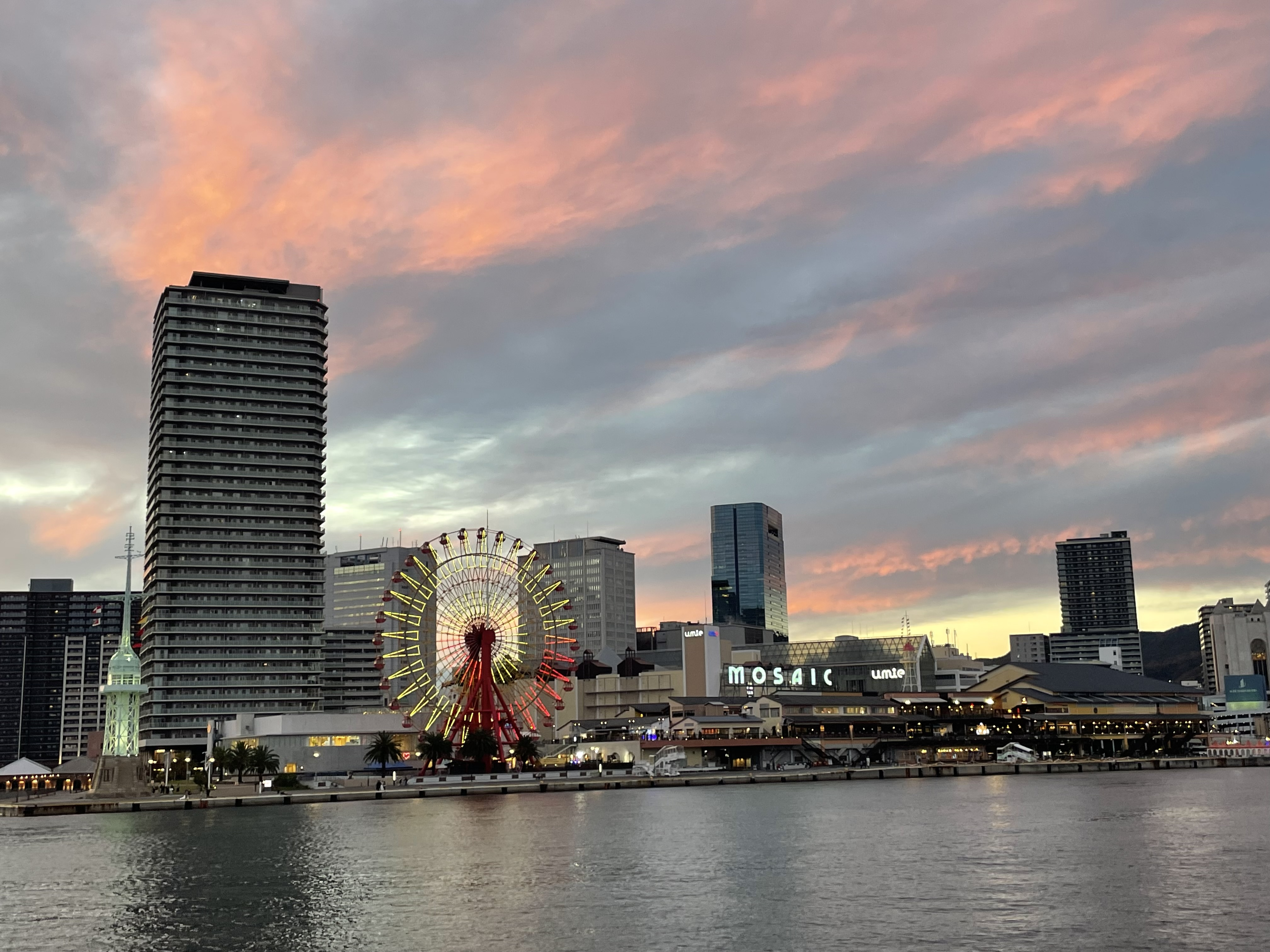
View of MOSAIC and Meriken Park from ferry at dusk (2022)

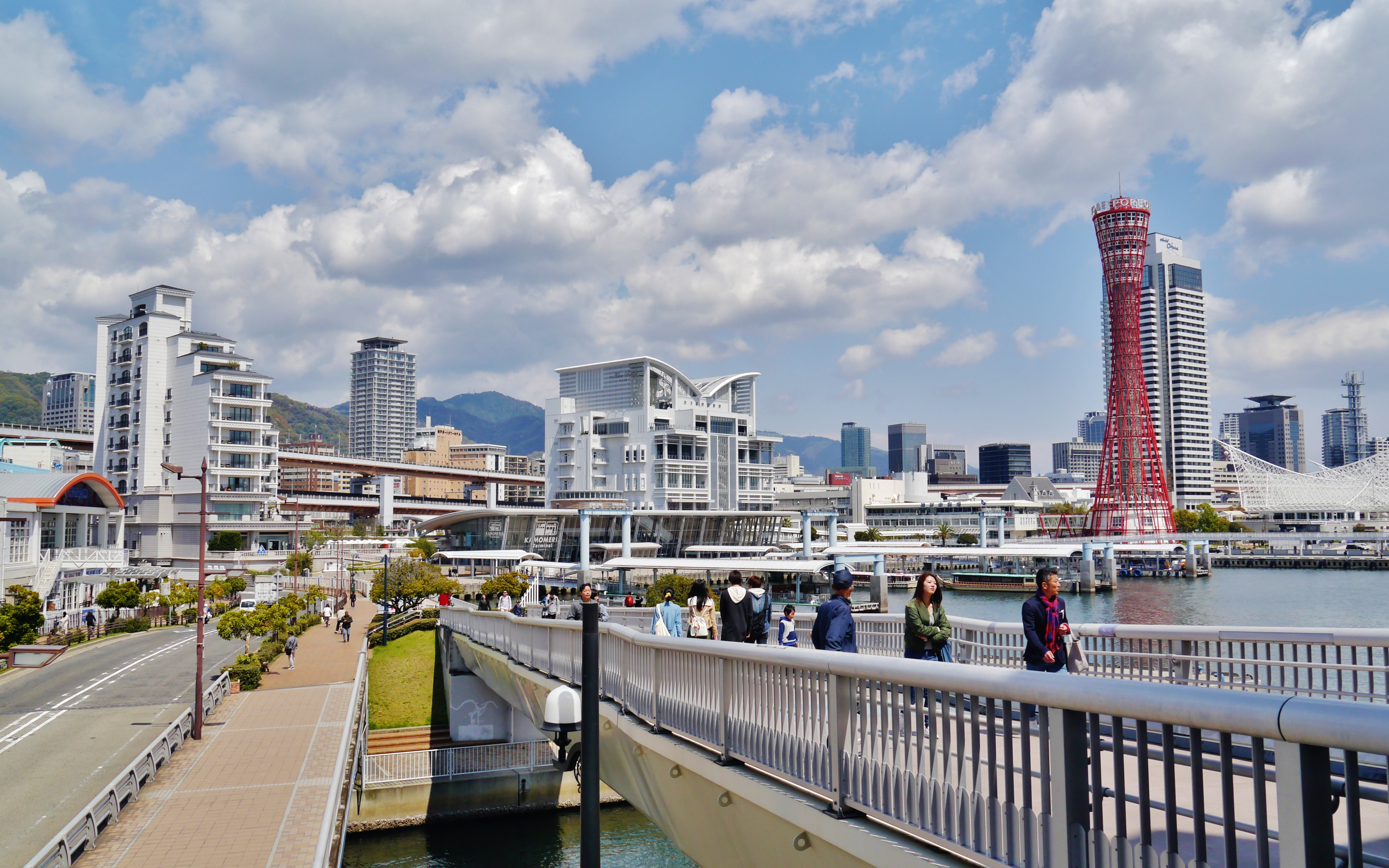
Meriken Park (2018)

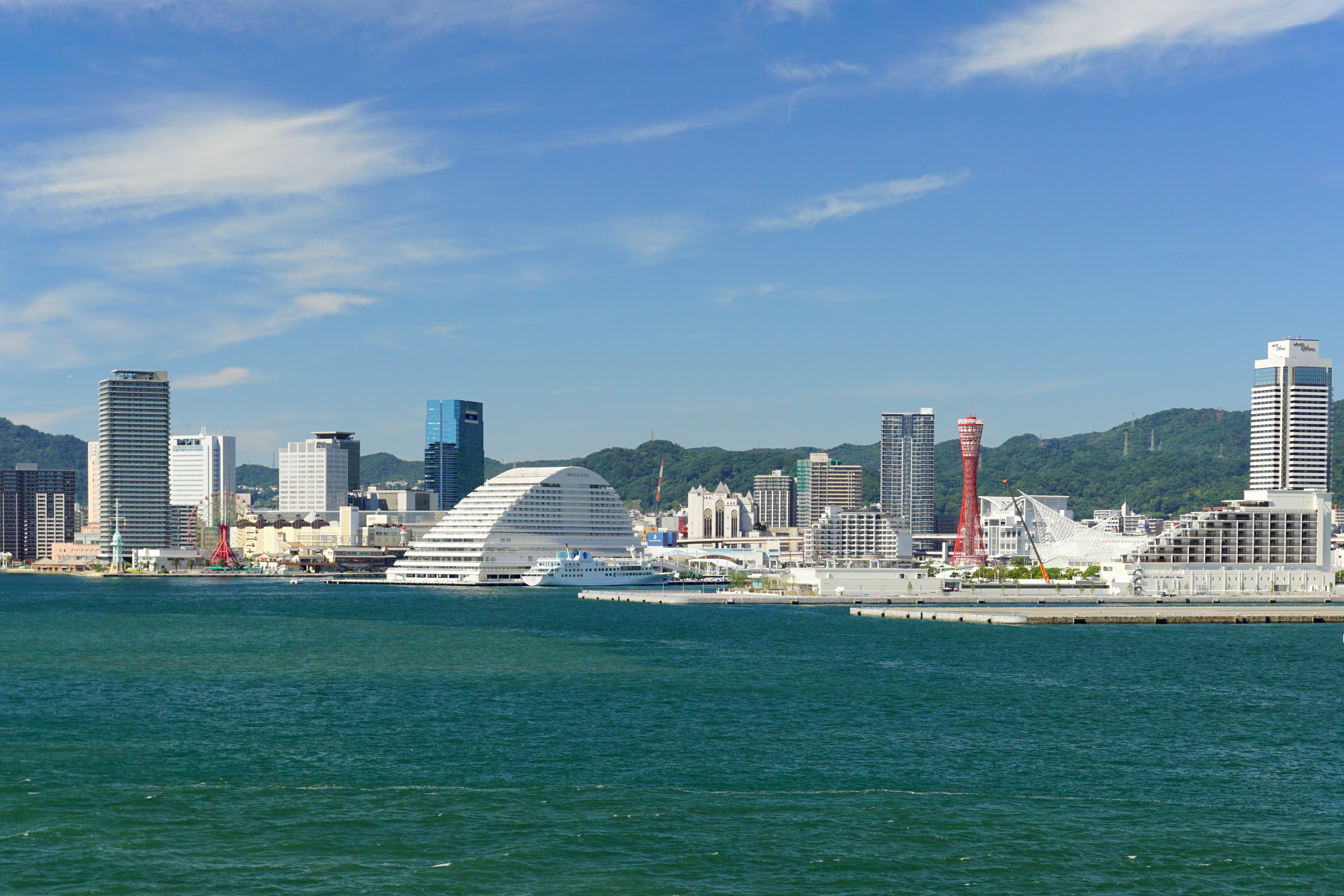
Skyline of Kobe from Kobe Bridge (2015)

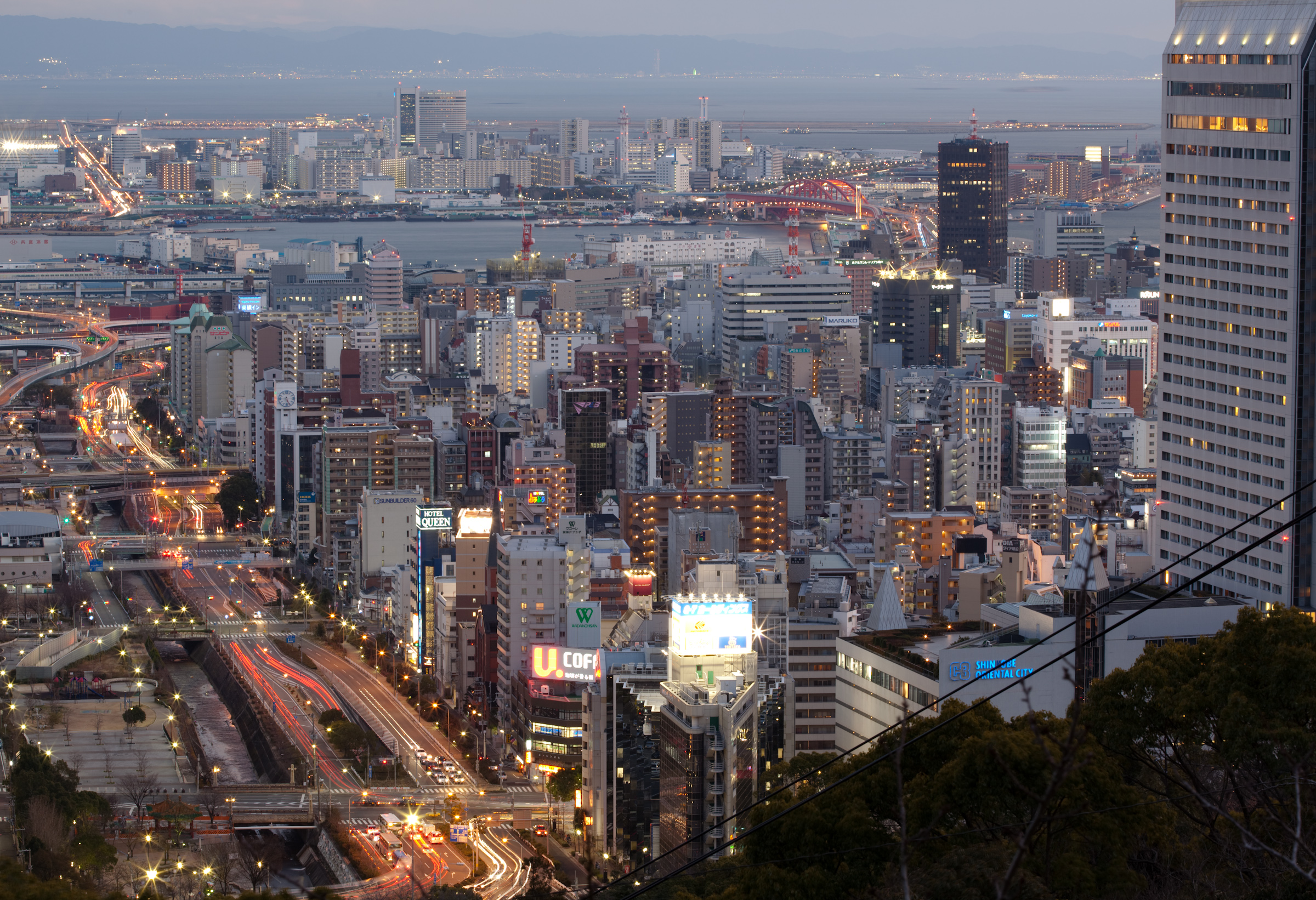
View of Sannomiya from Shin-Kobe Station (2009)

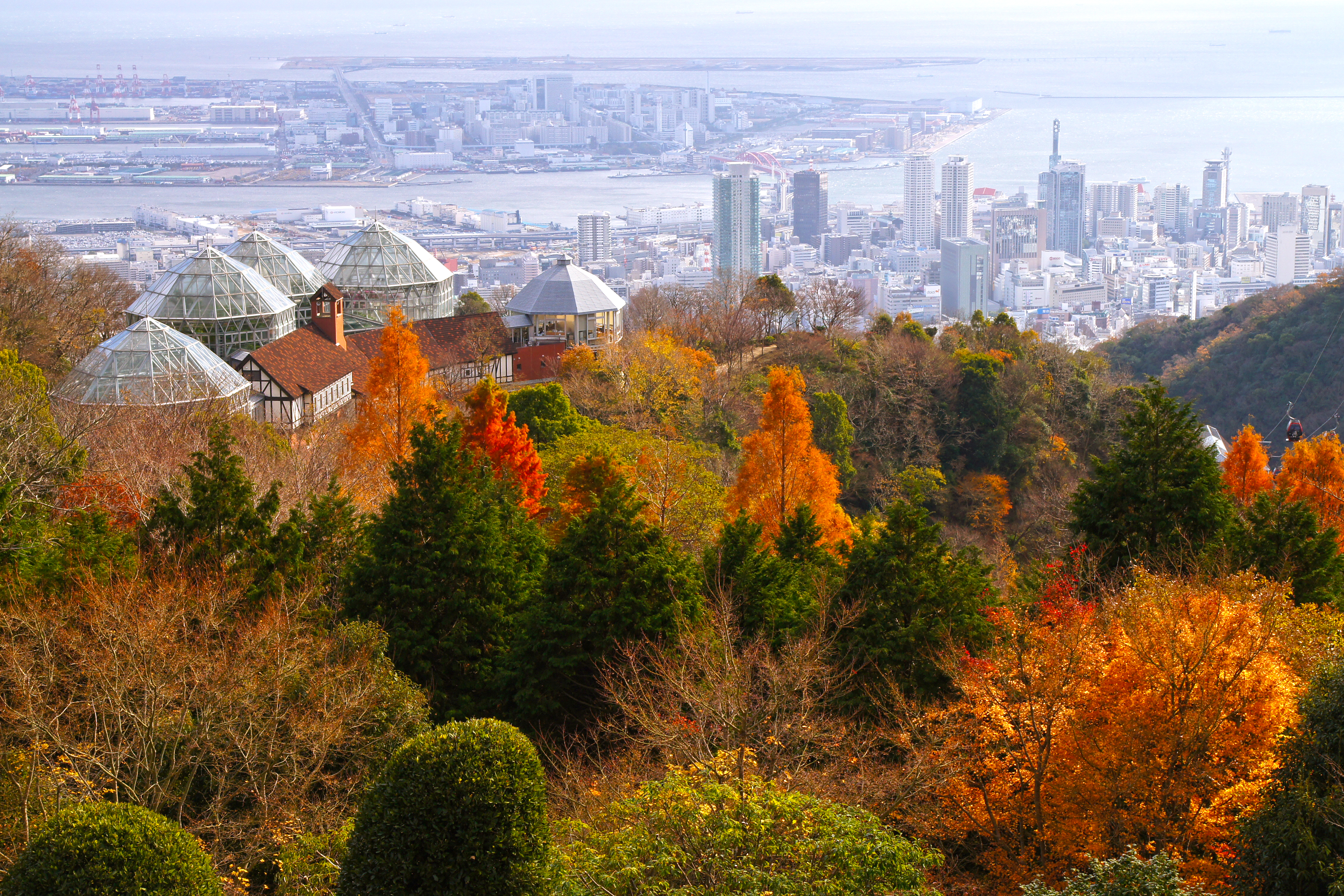
View from Nunobiki Herb Garden (2012)

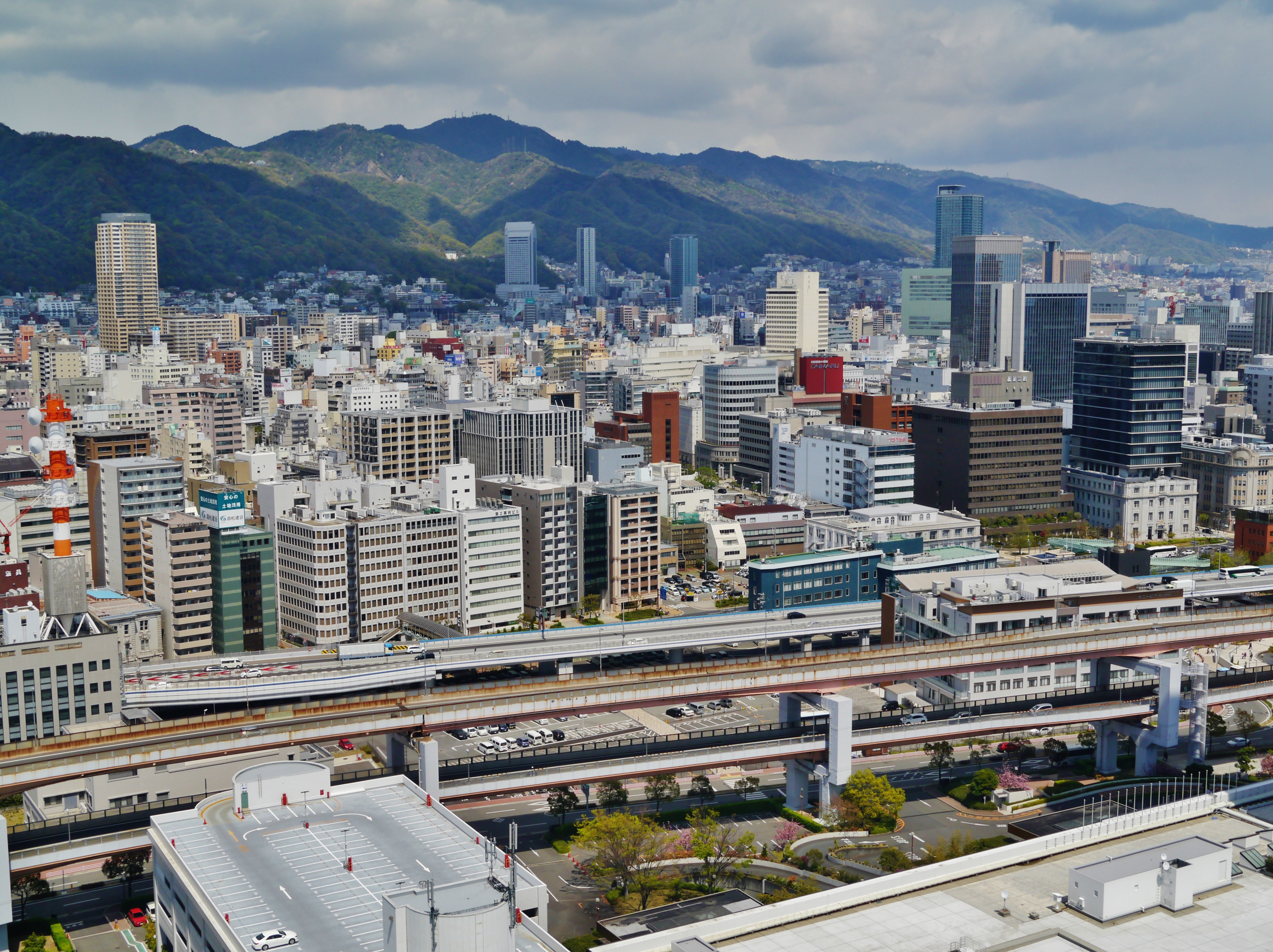
Kobe central business district (2018)

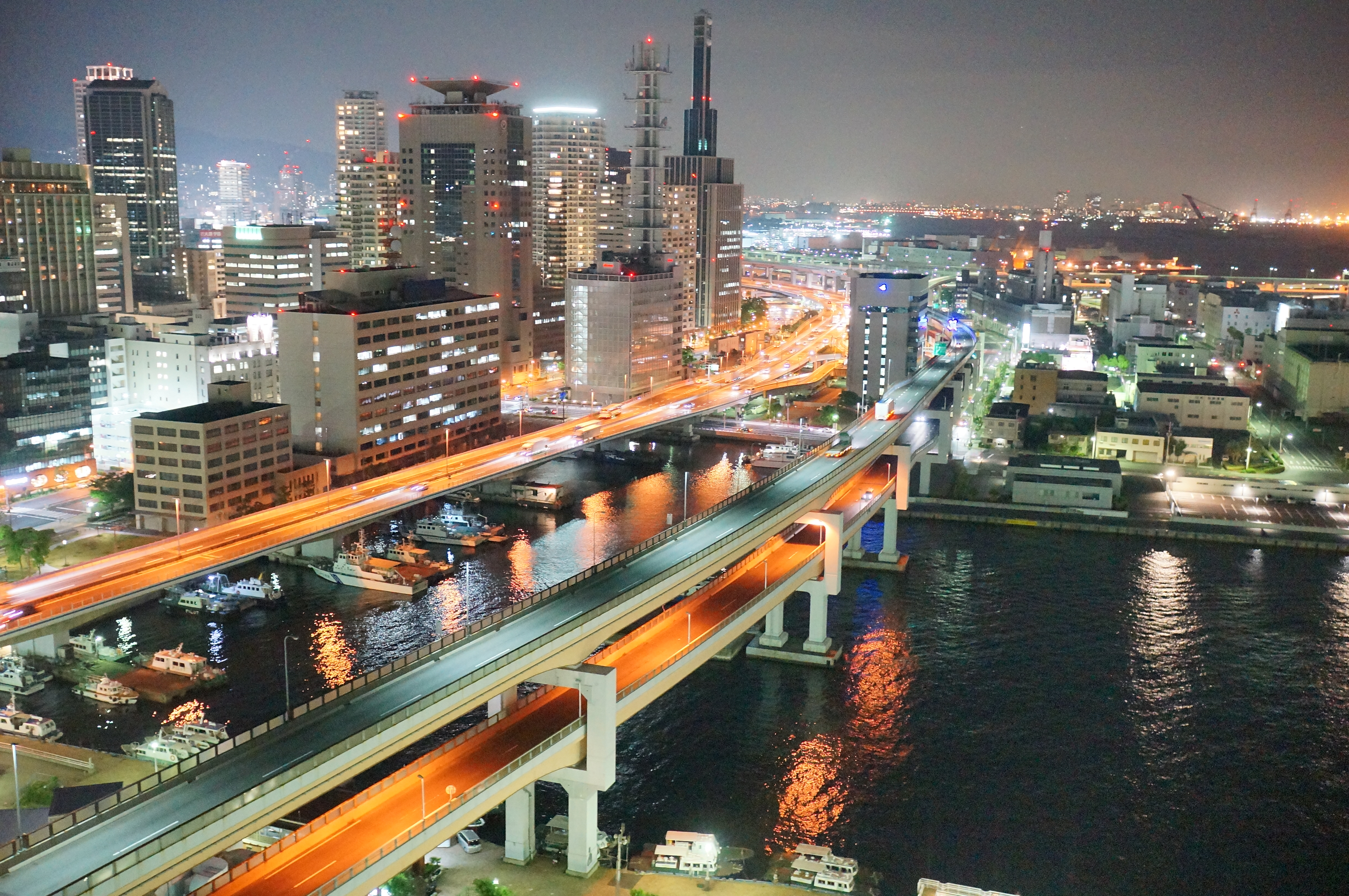
Kobe central business district at night (2016)

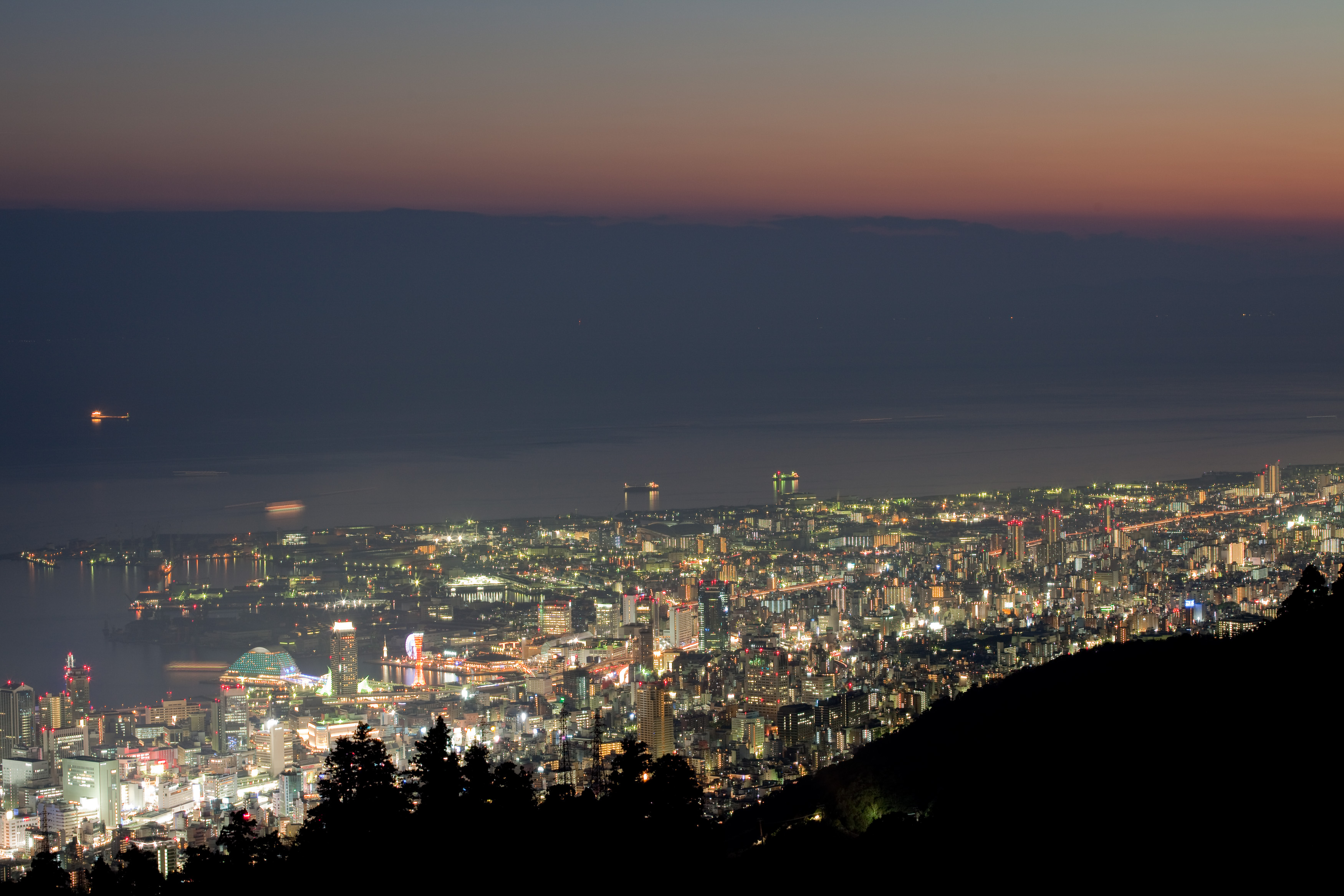
Downtown at night

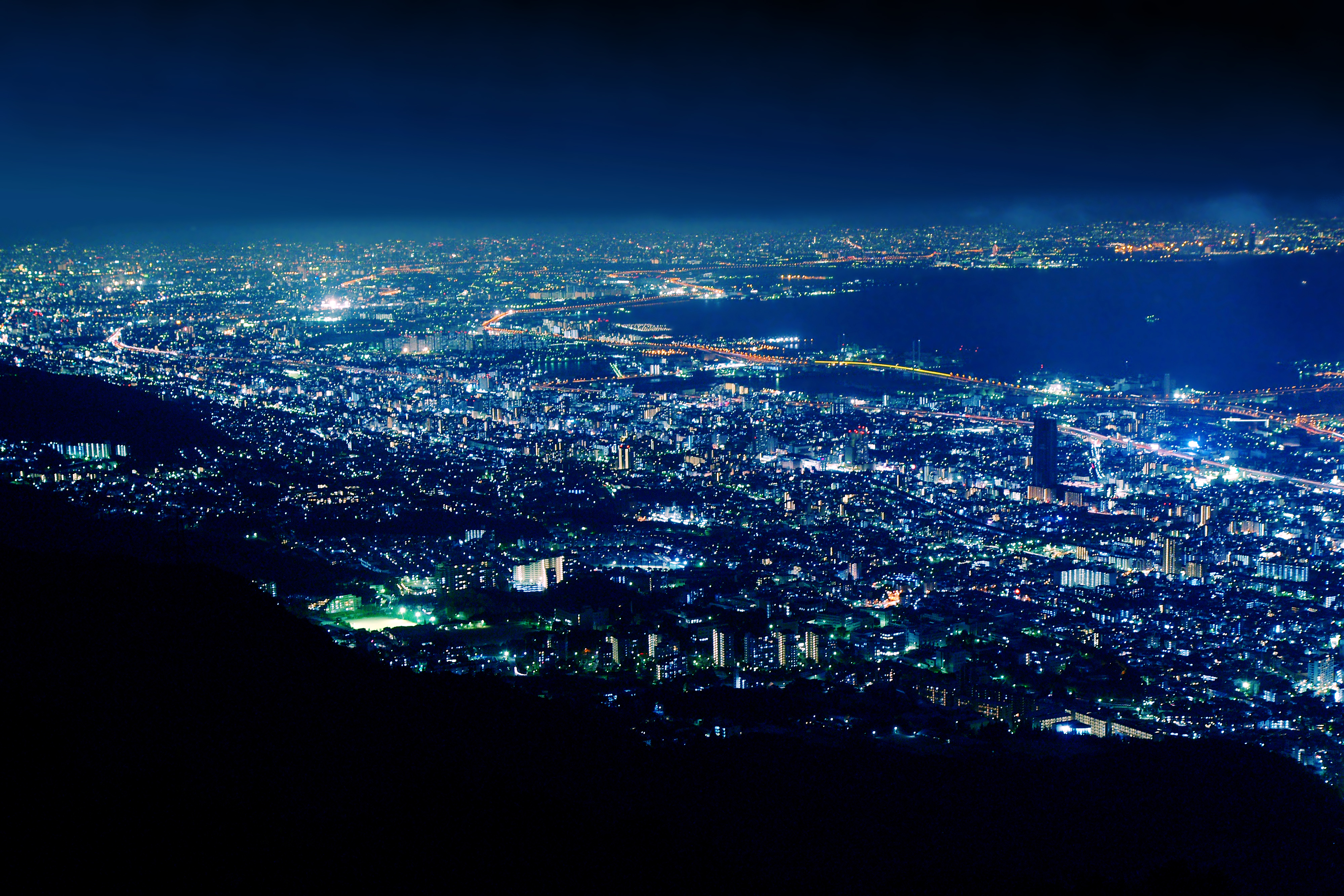
Night view from Kikuseidai

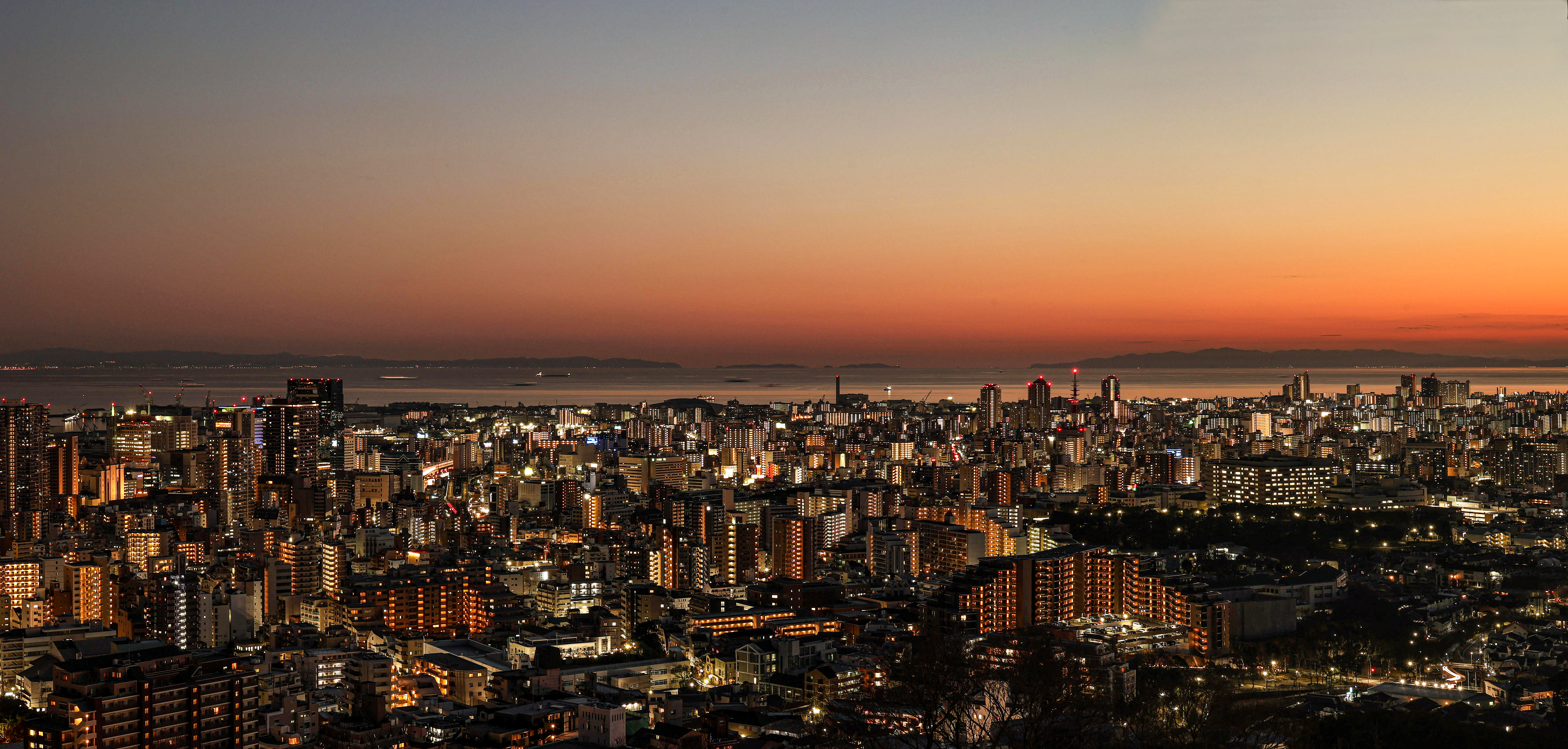
Sunset from Mt. Suwa (Suwayama) observation deck

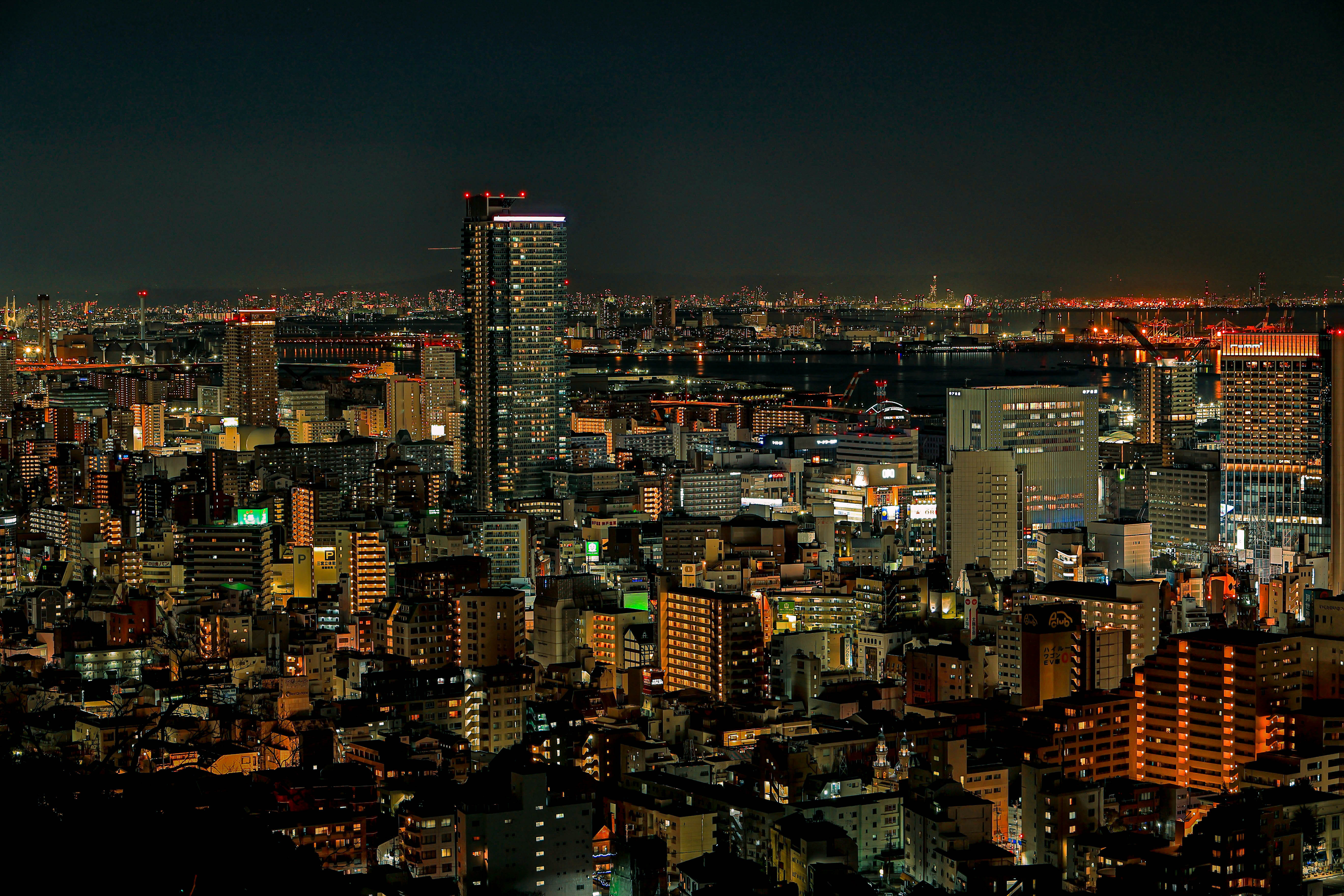
Chūō-ku, seen by night from Mt. Suwa observation deck

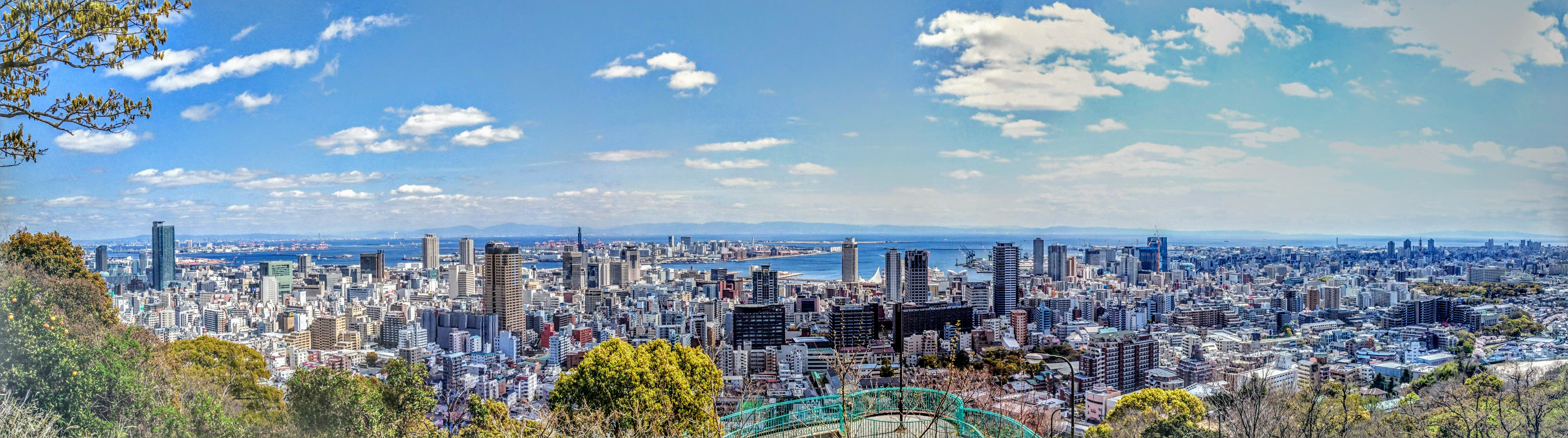
Panorama of Kobe from Mt. Suwa observation deck

=== Climate ===
Kobe has a humid subtropical climate (Köppen climate classification Cfa) with hot summers and cool to cold winters. Precipitation is significantly higher in summer than in winter, though on the whole lower than most parts of Honshū, and there is no significant snowfall. The average annual temperature in Kobe is 17.0 °C (62.6 °F). The average annual rainfall is 1,277.8 mm (50.31 in) with July as the wettest month. The temperatures are highest on average in August, at around 28.6 °C (83.5 °F), and lowest in January, at around 6.2 °C (43.2 °F). The highest temperature ever recorded in Kobe was 38.8 °C (101.8 °F) on August 5, 1994; the coldest temperature ever recorded was −7.2 °C (19.0 °F) on February 27, 1981.

Climate data for Kobe (1991−2020 normals, extremes 1896−present)
Month	Jan	Feb	Mar	Apr	May	Jun	Jul	Aug	Sep	Oct	Nov	Dec	Year
Record high °C (°F)	19.2 (66.6)	20.8 (69.4)	23.7 (74.7)	28.5 (83.3)	31.9 (89.4)	36.3 (97.3)	37.7 (99.9)	38.8 (101.8)	35.9 (96.6)	31.9 (89.4)	26.3 (79.3)	23.7 (74.7)	38.8 (101.8)
Mean maximum °C (°F)	14.4 (57.9)	16.4 (61.5)	19.8 (67.6)	24.6 (76.3)	28.7 (83.7)	31.3 (88.3)	34.8 (94.6)	35.7 (96.3)	33.2 (91.8)	28.1 (82.6)	22.7 (72.9)	17.9 (64.2)	36.0 (96.8)
Mean daily maximum °C (°F)	9.4 (48.9)	10.1 (50.2)	13.5 (56.3)	18.9 (66.0)	23.6 (74.5)	26.7 (80.1)	30.4 (86.7)	32.2 (90.0)	28.8 (83.8)	23.2 (73.8)	17.5 (63.5)	12.0 (53.6)	20.5 (68.9)
Daily mean °C (°F)	6.2 (43.2)	6.5 (43.7)	9.8 (49.6)	15.0 (59.0)	19.8 (67.6)	23.4 (74.1)	27.1 (80.8)	28.6 (83.5)	25.4 (77.7)	19.8 (67.6)	14.2 (57.6)	8.8 (47.8)	17.0 (62.6)
Mean daily minimum °C (°F)	3.1 (37.6)	3.4 (38.1)	6.3 (43.3)	11.4 (52.5)	16.5 (61.7)	20.6 (69.1)	24.7 (76.5)	26.1 (79.0)	22.6 (72.7)	16.7 (62.1)	10.9 (51.6)	5.7 (42.3)	14.0 (57.2)
Mean minimum °C (°F)	−1.1 (30.0)	−0.8 (30.6)	1.0 (33.8)	4.7 (40.5)	10.9 (51.6)	16.2 (61.2)	20.8 (69.4)	22.1 (71.8)	16.9 (62.4)	10.8 (51.4)	5.2 (41.4)	1.0 (33.8)	−1.9 (28.6)
Record low °C (°F)	−6.4 (20.5)	−7.2 (19.0)	−5.0 (23.0)	−0.6 (30.9)	3.9 (39.0)	10.0 (50.0)	14.5 (58.1)	16.1 (61.0)	10.5 (50.9)	5.3 (41.5)	−0.2 (31.6)	−4.3 (24.3)	−7.2 (19.0)
Average precipitation mm (inches)	38.4 (1.51)	55.6 (2.19)	94.2 (3.71)	100.6 (3.96)	134.7 (5.30)	176.7 (6.96)	187.9 (7.40)	103.4 (4.07)	157.2 (6.19)	118.0 (4.65)	62.4 (2.46)	48.7 (1.92)	1,277.8 (50.31)
Average snowfall cm (inches)	0 (0)	0 (0)	0 (0)	0 (0)	0 (0)	0 (0)	0 (0)	0 (0)	0 (0)	0 (0)	0 (0)	0 (0)	1 (0.4)
Average precipitation days (≥ 0.5 mm)	6.0	7.1	10.0	10.1	10.4	12.1	10.9	7.4	10.3	8.8	6.4	6.8	106.2
Average relative humidity (%)	62	61	61	61	64	72	74	71	67	64	63	62	65
Mean monthly sunshine hours	145.8	142.4	175.8	194.8	202.6	164.0	189.4	229.6	163.9	169.8	152.2	153.2	2,083.7
Source: Japan Meteorological Agency

Climate data for Kobe Airport (2006−2020 normals, extremes 2006−present)
Month	Jan	Feb	Mar	Apr	May	Jun	Jul	Aug	Sep	Oct	Nov	Dec	Year
Record high °C (°F)	17.2 (63.0)	19.5 (67.1)	22.9 (73.2)	24.9 (76.8)	30.2 (86.4)	34.5 (94.1)	36.2 (97.2)	37.0 (98.6)	36.2 (97.2)	31.5 (88.7)	25.6 (78.1)	21.9 (71.4)	37.0 (98.6)
Mean daily maximum °C (°F)	9.3 (48.7)	9.7 (49.5)	12.8 (55.0)	17.3 (63.1)	22.2 (72.0)	25.2 (77.4)	28.6 (83.5)	31.1 (88.0)	28.1 (82.6)	23.0 (73.4)	17.3 (63.1)	11.9 (53.4)	19.7 (67.5)
Daily mean °C (°F)	5.9 (42.6)	6.3 (43.3)	9.2 (48.6)	13.7 (56.7)	18.5 (65.3)	22.2 (72.0)	25.9 (78.6)	27.9 (82.2)	24.9 (76.8)	19.7 (67.5)	14.0 (57.2)	8.5 (47.3)	16.4 (61.5)
Mean daily minimum °C (°F)	2.4 (36.3)	2.6 (36.7)	5.3 (41.5)	9.9 (49.8)	15.1 (59.2)	19.8 (67.6)	23.9 (75.0)	25.6 (78.1)	22.1 (71.8)	16.7 (62.1)	10.7 (51.3)	5.1 (41.2)	13.2 (55.8)
Record low °C (°F)	−3.6 (25.5)	−3.4 (25.9)	−1.5 (29.3)	1.9 (35.4)	7.0 (44.6)	14.2 (57.6)	19.4 (66.9)	20.5 (68.9)	14.7 (58.5)	8.5 (47.3)	2.7 (36.9)	−1.4 (29.5)	−3.6 (25.5)
Average precipitation mm (inches)	33.3 (1.31)	54.3 (2.14)	83.2 (3.28)	83.7 (3.30)	117.6 (4.63)	164.5 (6.48)	186.9 (7.36)	84.7 (3.33)	135.1 (5.32)	106.1 (4.18)	52.8 (2.08)	49.3 (1.94)	1,148.4 (45.21)
Average precipitation days (≥ 1.0 mm)	4.6	6.6	8.3	8.8	8.6	9.8	10.2	6.0	8.8	7.9	5.7	5.8	91.1
Source: Japan Meteorological Agency

== Demographics ==
Foreigners in Kobe
Nationality	Population (2018)
South Korea	17,175
China	13,205
Vietnam	5,955
Taiwan	1,309
Others	8,974

Historical population
Year	Pop.	±%
1870	18,650	—
1880	48,786	+161.6%
1890	142,965	+193.0%
1900	283,839	+98.5%
1910	398,905	+40.5%
1920	746,500	+87.1%
1925	818,619	+9.7%
1930	915,234	+11.8%
1935	1,058,053	+15.6%
1940	1,134,458	+7.2%
1945	694,000	−38.8%
1950	821,062	+18.3%
1955	986,344	+20.1%
1960	1,113,977	+12.9%
1965	1,216,682	+9.2%
1970	1,288,930	+5.9%
1975	1,360,605	+5.6%
1980	1,367,390	+0.5%
1985	1,410,734	+3.2%
1990	1,477,410	+4.7%
1995	1,423,792	−3.6%
2000	1,493,398	+4.9%
2005	1,525,393	+2.1%
2010	1,544,873	+1.3%
2015	1,537,272	−0.5%
2020	1,521,241	−1.0%

The Kobe Metropolitan Employment Area

As of September 2007, Kobe had an estimated population of 1,530,295 making up 658,876 households. This was an increase of 1,347 persons or approximately 0.1% over the previous year. The population density was approximately 2,768 persons per square kilometre, while there are about 90.2 males to every 100 females. About thirteen percent of the population are between the ages of 0 and 14, sixty-seven percent are between 15 and 64, and twenty percent are over the age of 65.

Approximately 44,000 registered foreign nationals live in Kobe. The four most common nationalities are Korean (22,237), Chinese (12,516), Vietnamese (1,301), and American (1,280).

== Economy ==
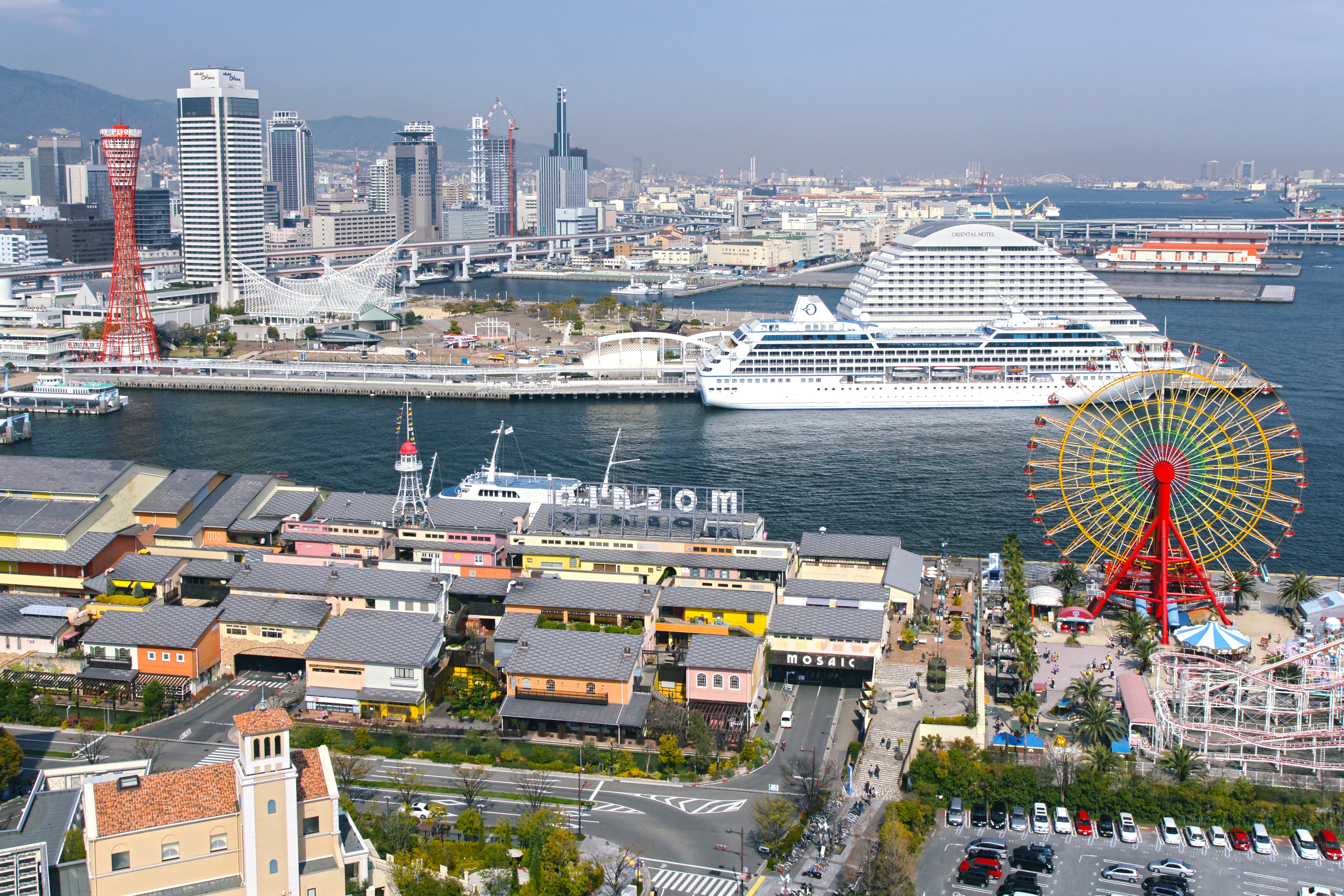
As of 2007 Kobe was the busiest port in the Kansai region.

The Port of Kobe is both an important port and manufacturing center within the Hanshin Industrial Region. Kobe is the busiest container port in the region, surpassing even Osaka, and the fourth-busiest in Japan.

As of 2004, the city's total real GDP was ¥6.3 trillion, which amounts to thirty-four percent of the GDP for Hyōgo Prefecture and approximately eight percent for the whole Kansai region. Per capita income for the year was approximately ¥2.7 million. Broken down by sector, about one percent of those employed work in the primary sector (agriculture, fishing and mining), twenty-one percent work in the secondary sector (manufacturing and industry), and seventy-eight percent work in the service sector.

The value of manufactured goods produced and exported from Kobe for 2004 was ¥2.5 trillion. The four largest sectors in terms of value of goods produced are small appliances, food products, transportation equipment, and communication equipment making up over fifty percent of Kobe's manufactured goods. In terms of numbers of employees, food products, small appliances, and transportation equipment make up the three largest sectors.

The GDP in Kobe Metropolitan Employment Area (2.4 million people) is US$96.0 billion in 2010.

=== Major companies and institutes ===
Japanese companies which have their headquarters in Kobe include ASICS, a shoe manufacturer; Daiei, a department store chain; Kawasaki Heavy Industries, Kawasaki Shipbuilding Co., Kinki Sharyo, Mitsubishi Motors, Mitsubishi Heavy Industries (ship manufacturer), Mitsubishi Electric, Kobe Steel, Sumitomo Rubber Industries, Sysmex Corporation (medical devices manufacturer) and TOA Corporation. Other companies include the confectionery manufacturers Konigs-Krone and Morozoff Ltd., Sun Television Japan and UCC Ueshima Coffee Co.

There are over 100 international corporations that have their East Asian or Japanese headquarters in Kobe. Of these, twenty-four are from China, eighteen from the United States, and nine from Switzerland. Some prominent corporations include Eli Lilly and Company, Nestlé, Procter & Gamble, Tempur-Pedic, Boehringer-Ingelheim, and Toys "R" Us. In 2018, April, Swift Engineering USA, an American aerospace engineering firm established their joint venture in Kobe called Swift Xi Inc.

Kobe is the site of a number of research institutes, such as the RIKEN Kobe Institute Center for developmental biology and medical imaging techniques, and Center for Computational Science (R-CCS, home of the Fugaku supercomputer), the National Institute of Information and Communications Technology (NICT) Advanced ICT Research Institute, the National Research Institute for Earth Science and Disaster Prevention, and the Asian Disaster Reduction Center.

International organizations include the WHO Centre for Health Development, an intergovernmental agency forming part of the World Health Organization. The city is also home to specialized medical institutions such as KUMA hospital, which is internationally recognized for its expertise in thyroid treatment and research. The Consulate-General of Panama in Kobe is located on the eighth floor of the Moriyama Building in Chūō-ku, Kobe.

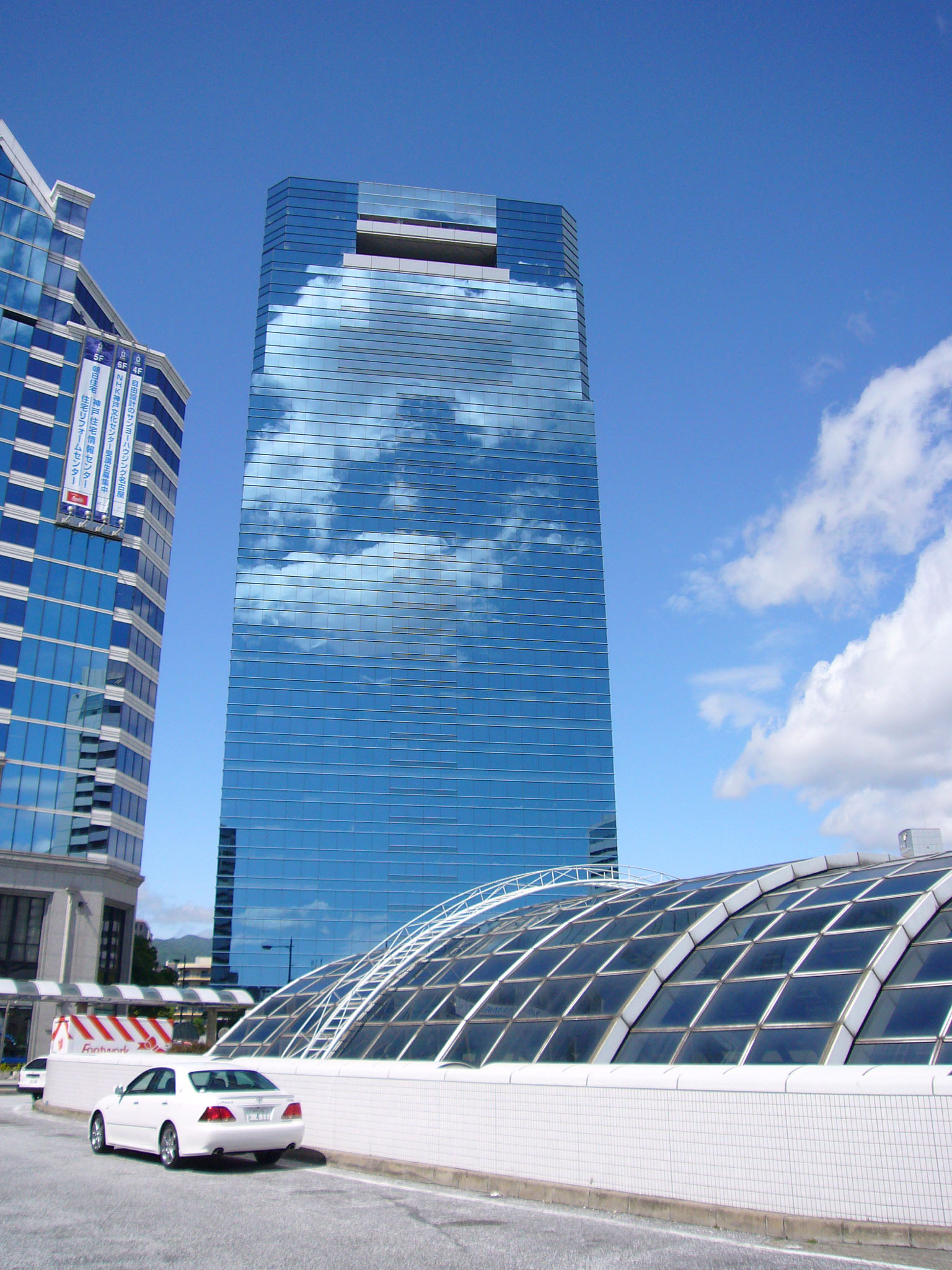
Kawasaki Heavy Industries headquarters on Harborland

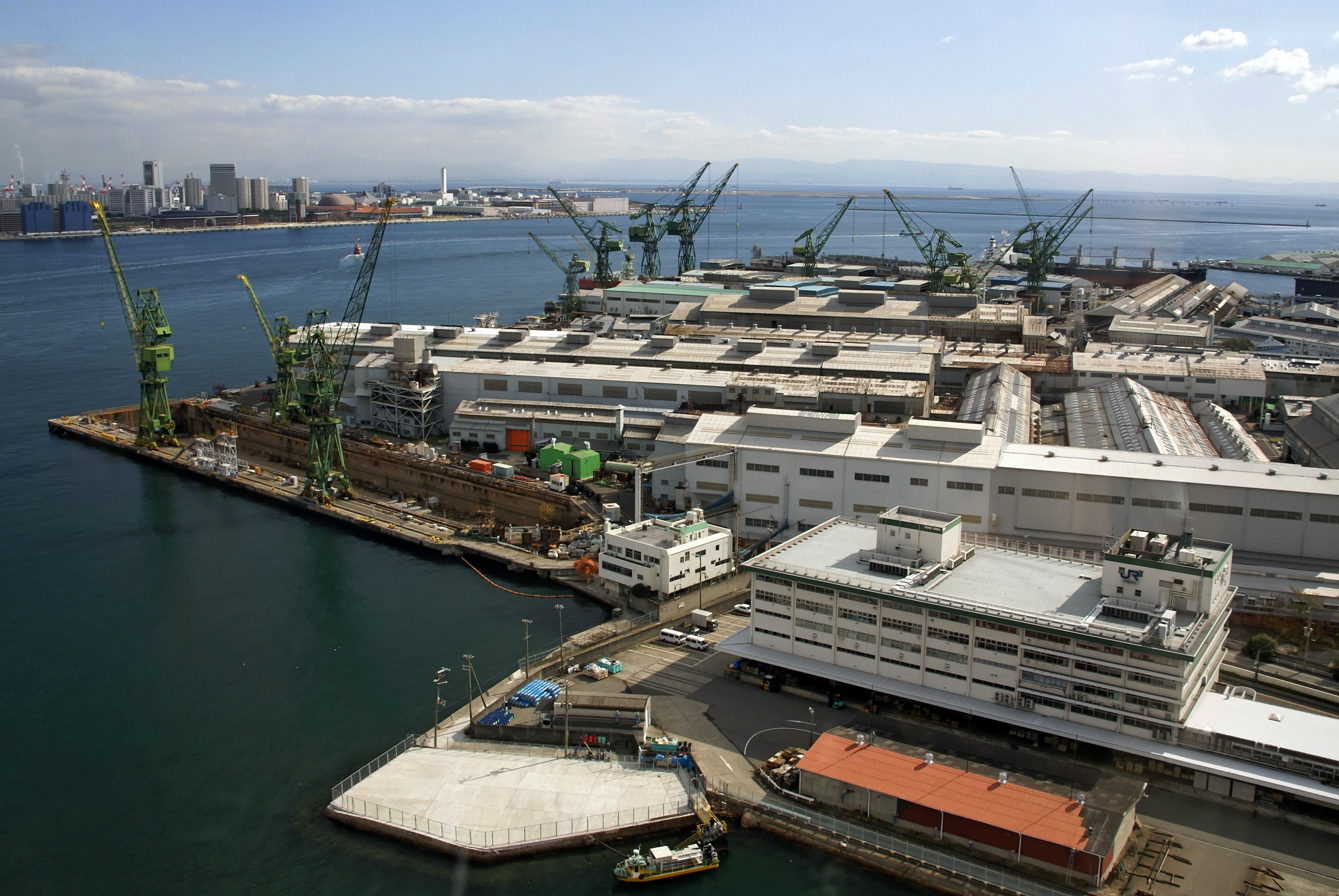
Kawasaki Shipbuilding Co. headquarters on Kobe Harbor

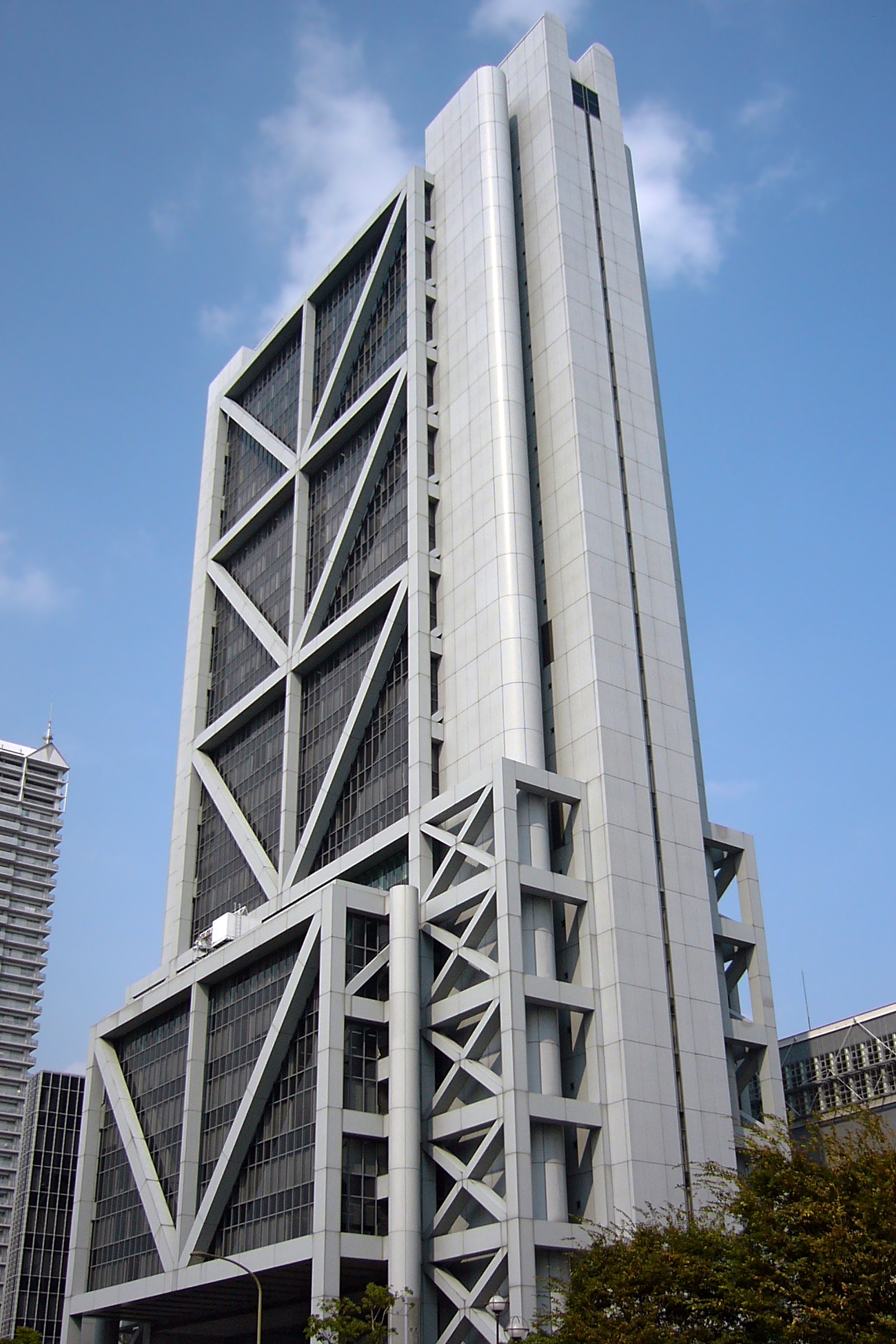
Procter & Gamble Asia headquarters on Rokko Island

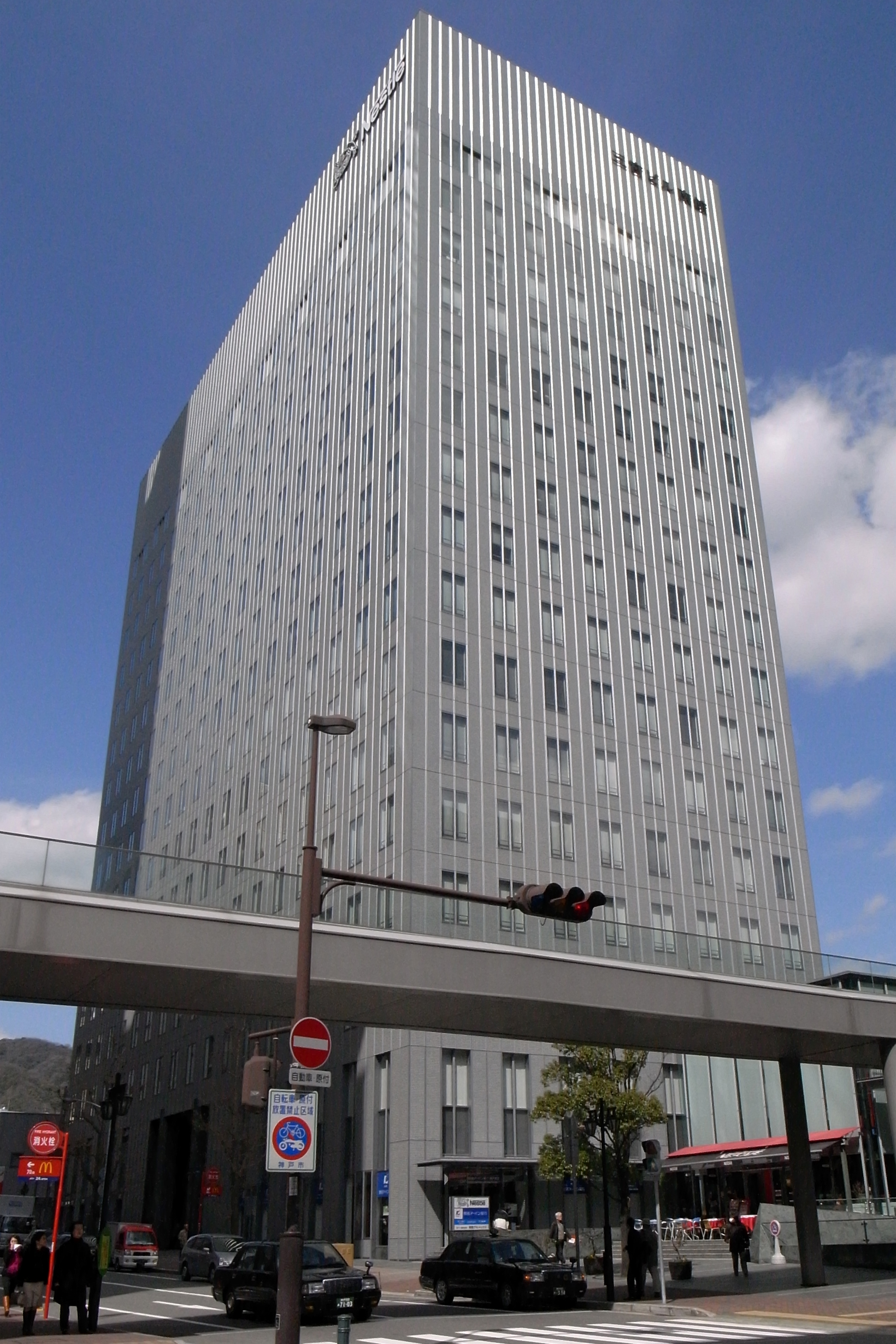
Nestlé Japan Ltd. headquarters on Sannomiya

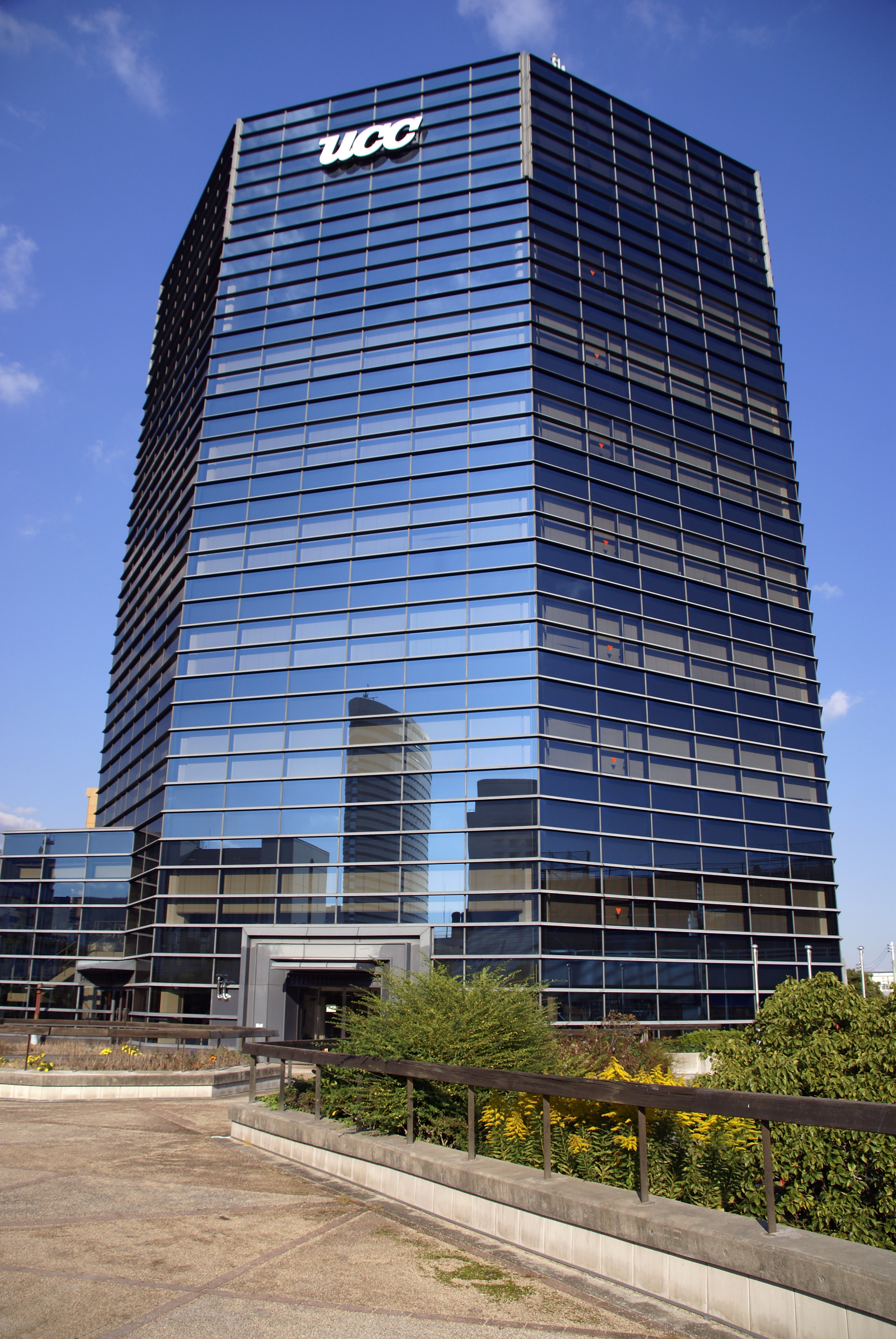
UCC Ueshima Coffee Co. headquarters on Port Island

== Transportation ==
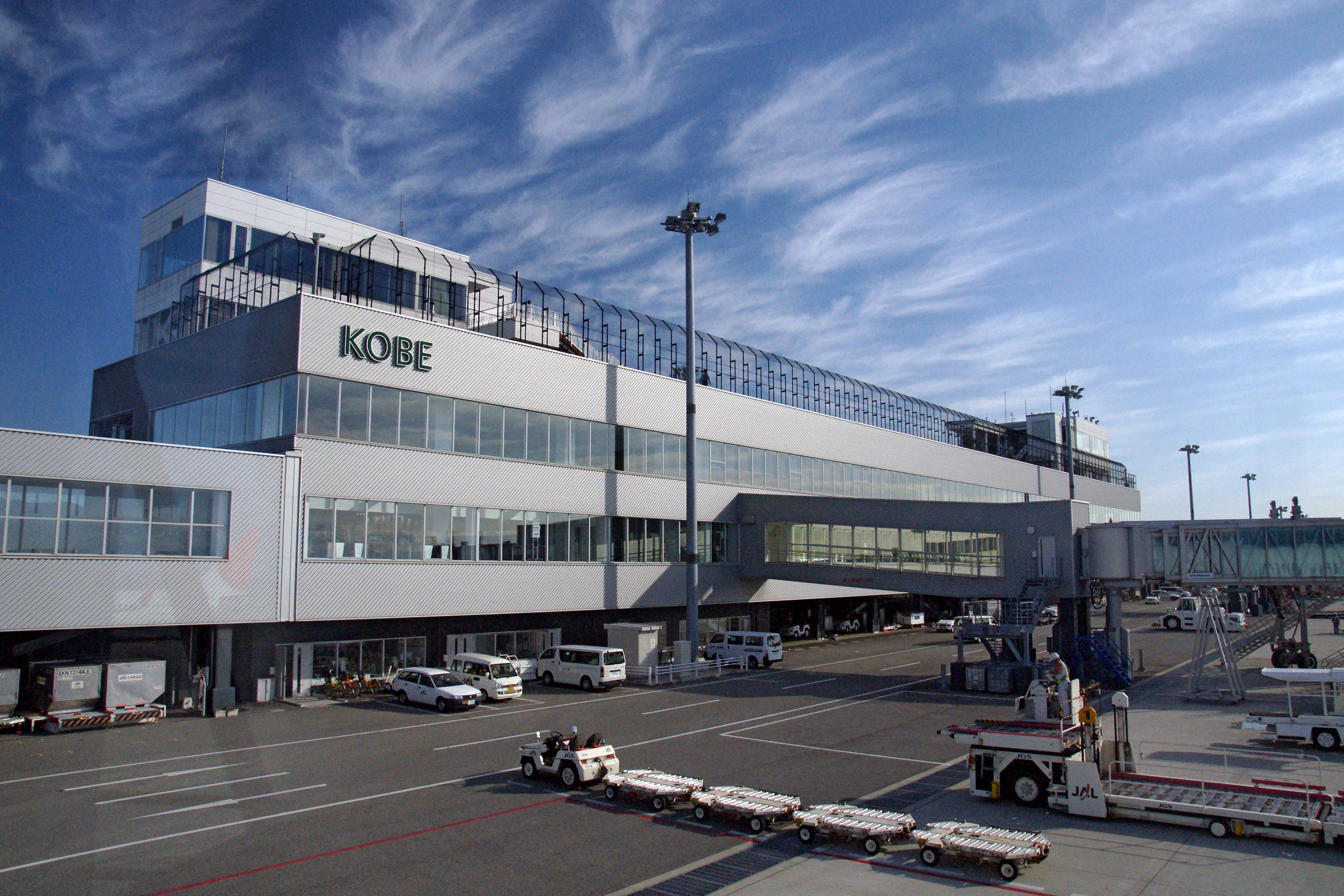
Kobe Airport

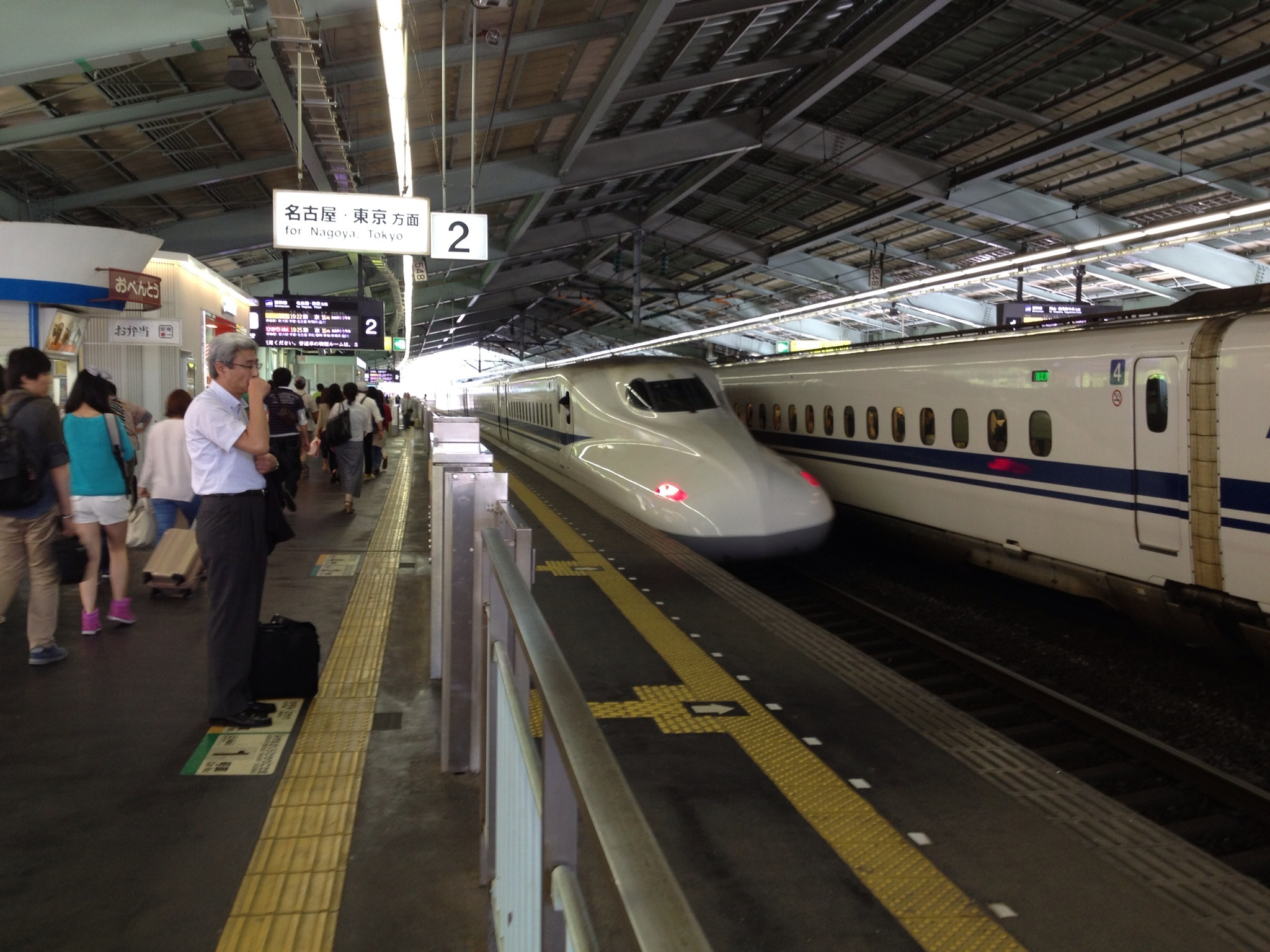
Shin-Kobe Station

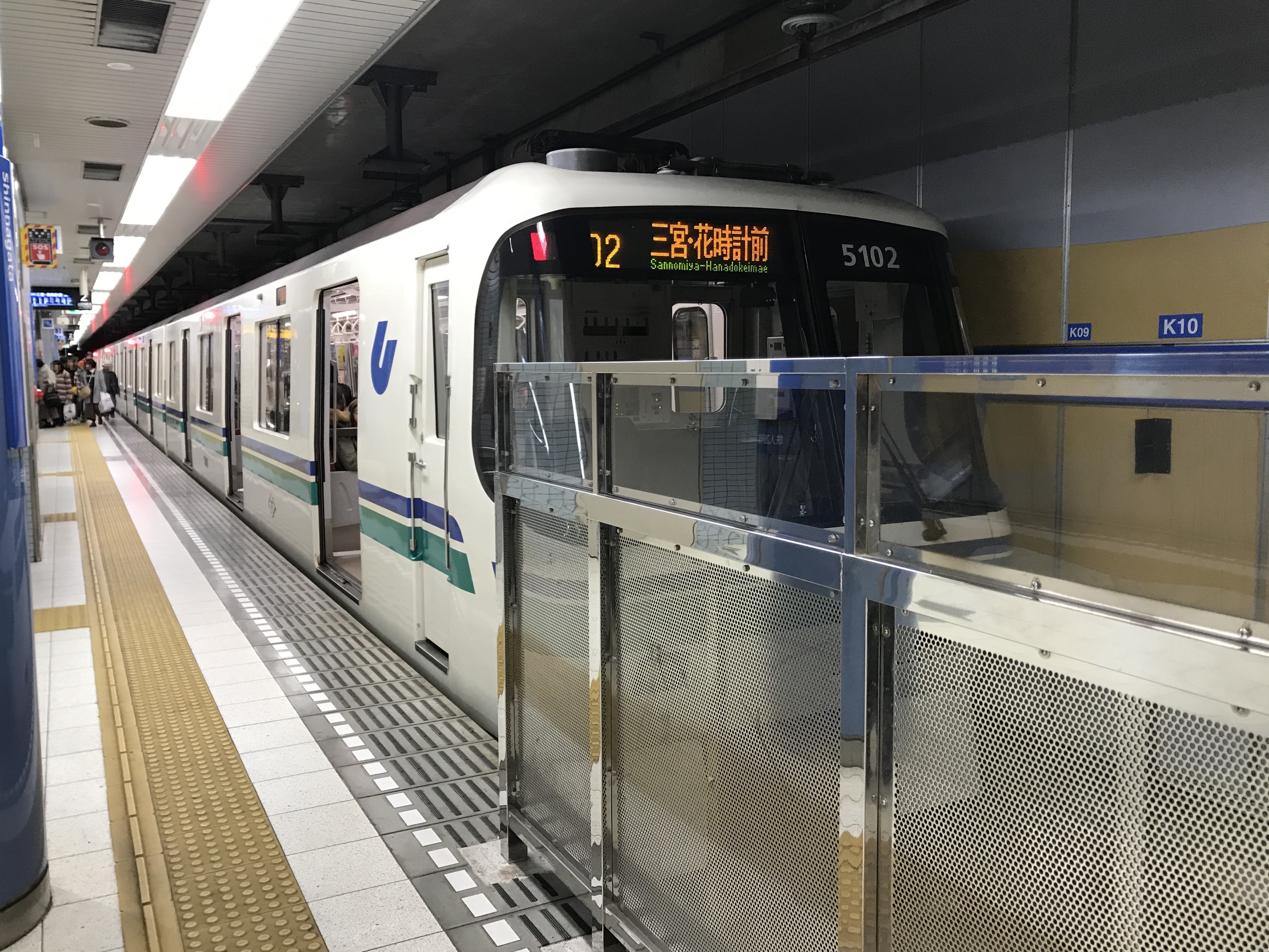
Kobe Municipal Subway

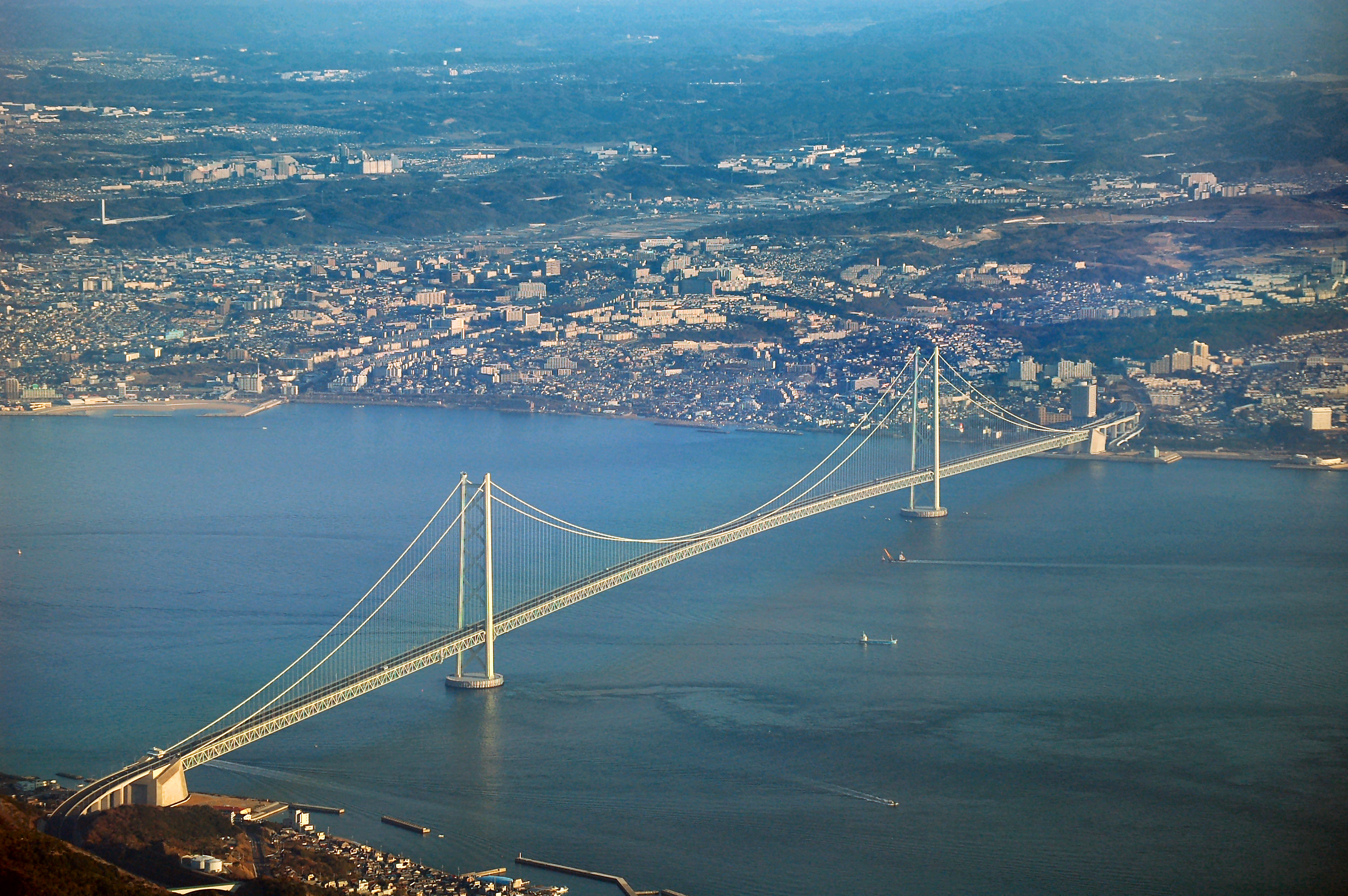
The Akashi Kaikyō Bridge extends from Kobe to Awaji Island.

=== Air ===
Itami Airport, in nearby Itami, serves primarily domestic flights throughout Japan, Kobe Airport, built on a reclaimed island south of Port Island, also offers mostly domestic and charter flights, while Kansai International Airport in Osaka mainly serves international flights in the area.

=== Rail ===
The JR West Sanyō Shinkansen stops at Shin-Kobe Station. Sannomiya Station is the main commuter hub in Kobe, serving as the transfer point for major intercity rail services: the JR Kobe Line connects Kobe to Osaka and Himeji, while both the Hankyū Kobe Line and the Hanshin Main Line run from Kobe to Umeda Station in Osaka. Sanyō Electric Railway trains from Himeji reach Sannomiya via the Kōbe Rapid Transit Railway. Kōbe Electric Railway runs north to Sanda and Arima Onsen.

Kobe Municipal Subway provides connections to Shin-Kobe and Sannomiya stations from Kobe's western and eastern suburbs. Additionally, Kobe New Transit runs two lines serving Kobe Airport and Rokko Island.

=== Ropeway ===
Over Mount Rokkō, the city has two funicular lines and three aerial lifts as well, namely Maya Cablecar, Rokkō Cable Line, Rokkō Arima Ropeway, Maya Ropeway, and Shin-Kobe Ropeway.

=== Road ===
Kobe is a transportation hub for a number of expressways, including the Meishin Expressway (Nagoya – Kobe) and the Hanshin Expressway (Osaka – Kobe). Other expressways include the Sanyō Expressway (Kobe – Yamaguchi) and the Chūgoku Expressway (Osaka – Yamaguchi). The Kobe-Awaji-Naruto Expressway runs from Kobe to Naruto via Awaji Island and includes the Akashi Kaikyō Bridge, the second longest suspension bridge in the world.

=== Maritime ===
The Port of Kobe is one of Japan's busiest container ports and also offers ferry services to Kansai International Airport, Shikoku and Kyushu. Sub Area Activity Hanshin of the Japan Maritime Self-Defense Forces provides monitoring across Osaka Bay and Harima Sea.

== Education ==
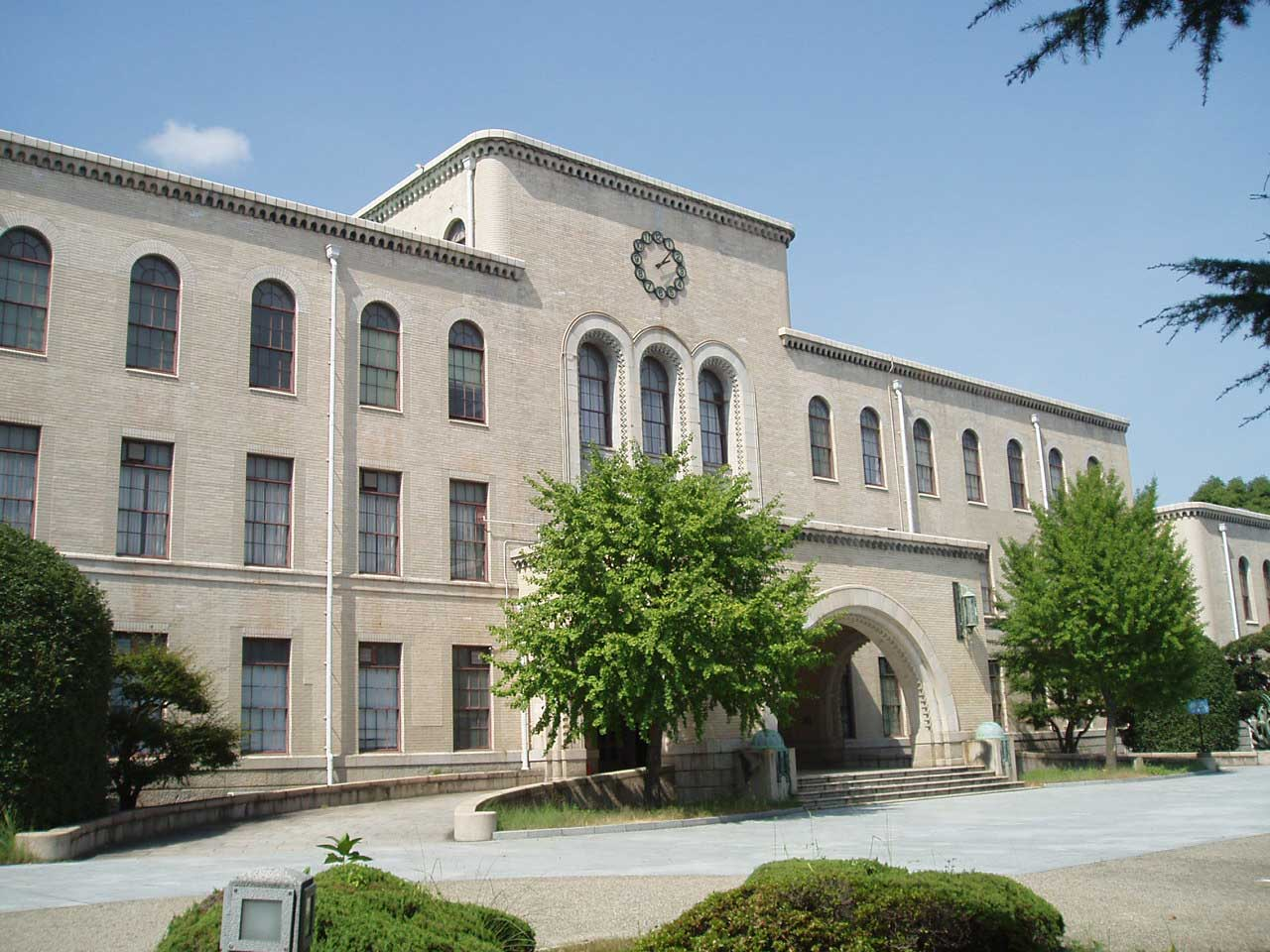
Kobe University main building

The city of Kobe directly administers 169 elementary and 81 middle schools, with enrollments of approximately 80,200 and 36,000 students, respectively. If the city's four private elementary schools and fourteen private middle schools are included, these figures jump to a total 82,000 elementary school students and 42,300 junior high students enrolled for the 2006 school year.

Kobe also directly controls six of the city's twenty-five full-time public high schools including Fukiai High School and Rokkō Island High School. The remainder are administered by the Hyogo Prefectural Board of Education. In addition, twenty-five high schools are run privately within the city. The total enrollment for high schools in 2006 was 43,400.

Kobe is home to eighteen public and private universities, including Kobe University, Kobe Institute of Computing and Konan University, and eight junior colleges. Students enrolled for 2006 reached 67,000 and 4,100, respectively. Kobe is also home to 17 Japanese language schools for international students, including the international training group Lexis Japan.

International schools serve both long-term foreign residents and expatriates living in Kobe and the Kansai region. The schools offer instruction in English, German, Chinese, and Korean. There are three English-language international schools: Canadian Academy, Marist Brothers International School, and St. Michael's International School.

== Culture ==
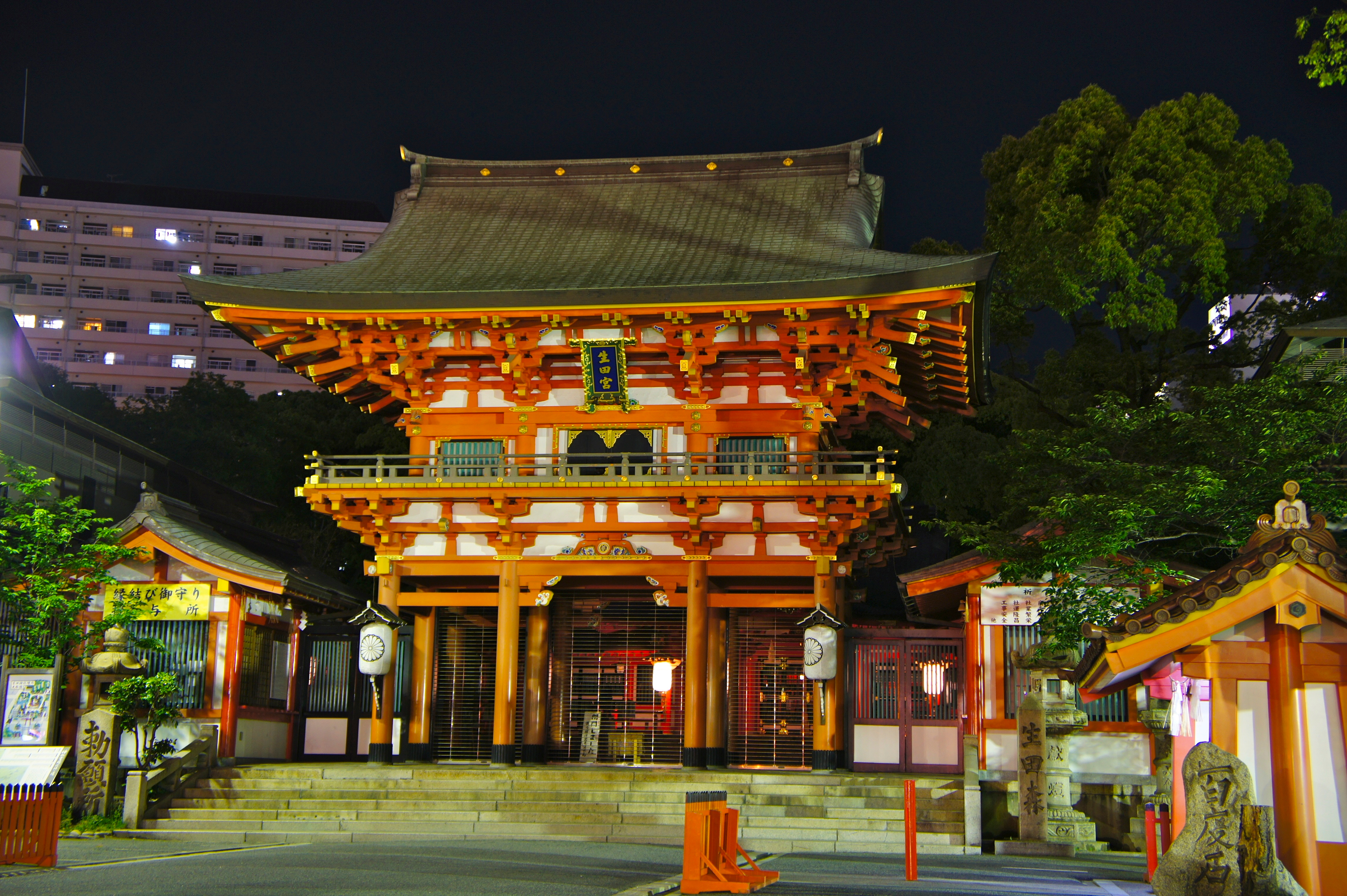
Ikuta Shrine, Kobe

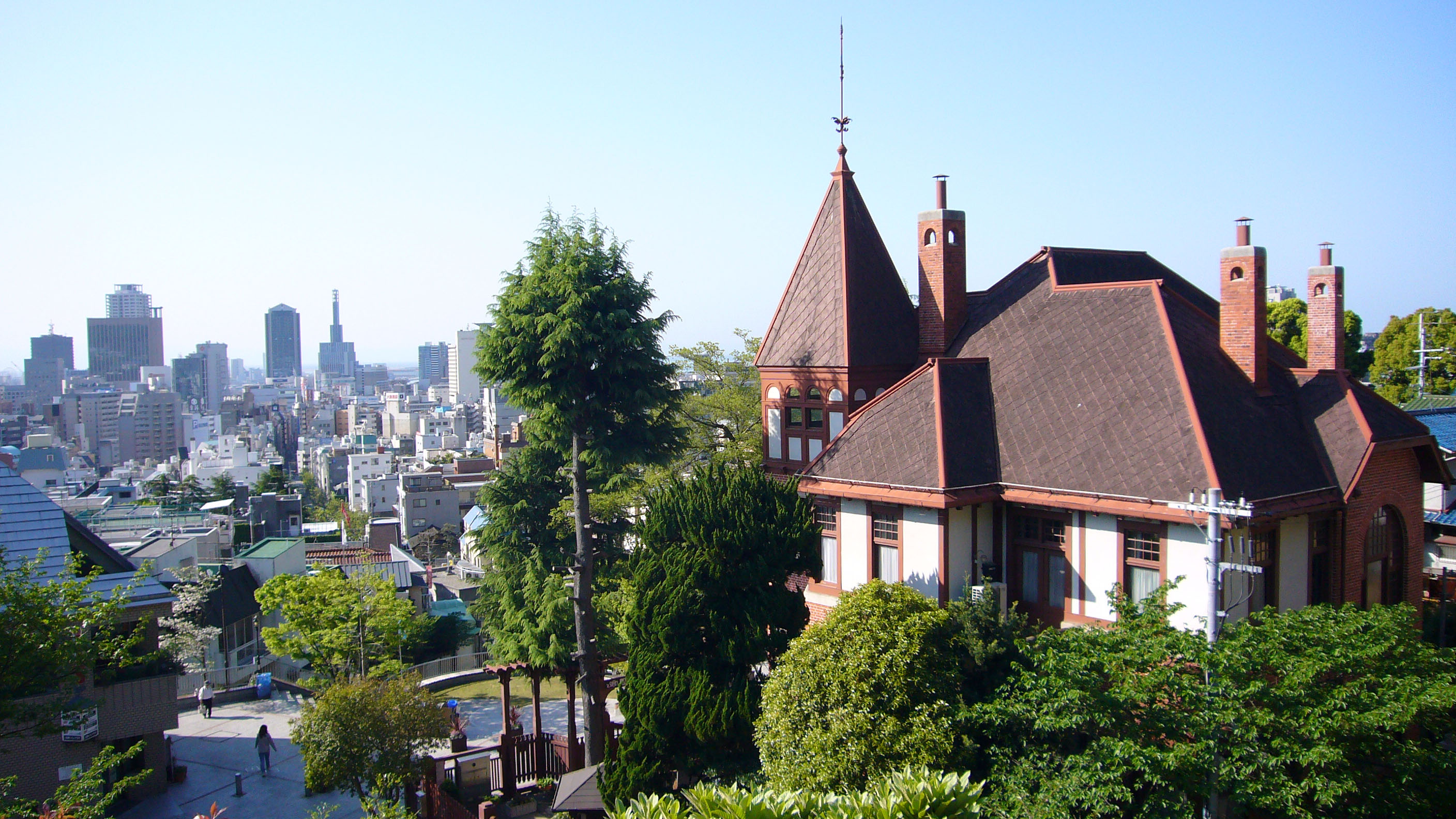
Weathercock House, one of the many foreign residences of the Kitano area of Kobe

Kobe is most famous for its Kobe beef (which is raised in the surrounding Hyōgo Prefecture) and Arima Onsen (hot springs). Notable buildings include the Ikuta Shrine as well as the Kobe Port Tower. Nearby mountains such as Mount Rokkō and Mount Maya overlook the city. The city is recognized as a "Design City" by UNESCO.

The city is widely associated with cosmopolitanism and fashion, encapsulated in the Japanese saying, "If you can't go to Paris, go to Kobe." The biannual fashion event Kobe Fashion Week, featuring the Kobe Collection, is held in Kobe. The jazz festival "Kobe Jazz Street" has been held every October at jazz clubs and hotels since 1981. It also hosts both a Festival, as well as a statue of Elvis Presley, the unveiling of which was heralded by the presence of former Prime Minister of Japan Junichiro Koizumi. Kobe is well known in Japan as being a city for the affluent, as many high-end stores and mansions line its streets.

Kobe is the site of Japan's first golf course, Kobe Golf Club, established by Arthur Hesketh Groom in 1903, and Japan's first mosque, Kobe Mosque, built in 1935. The city hosts the Kobe Regatta & Athletic Club, founded in 1870 by Alexander Cameron Sim, and a prominent foreign cemetery. A number of Western-style residences – ijinkan (異人館) – from the 19th century still stand in Kitano and elsewhere in Kobe. Museums include the Kobe City Museum and Museum of Literature.

The city headquarters the professional wrestling promotion Dragongate, established in 2004 as an offshoot of Último Dragón's original Toryumon system.

The dialect spoken in Kobe is called Kobe-ben, a sub-dialect of Kansai dialect.

== Sports ==
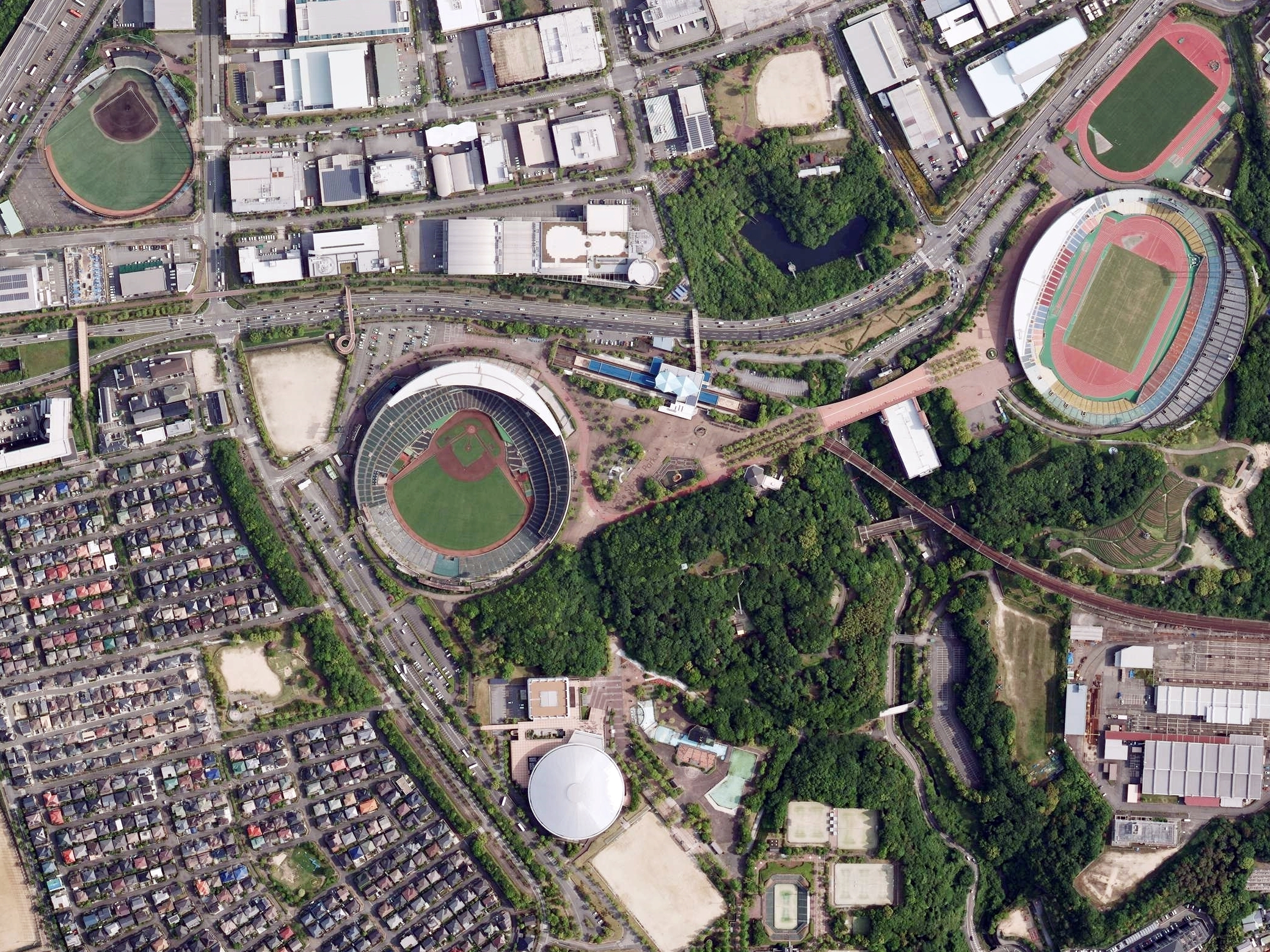
Kobe Sports Park in Suma Ward.

Club	Sport	League	Venue	Established
Kobe Storks	Basketball	Japan Professional Basketball League	World Memorial Hall	2011
Orix Buffaloes	Baseball	Pacific League	Kobe Sports Park Baseball Stadium; Osaka Dome	1938
Vissel Kobe	Football	J. League	Noevir Stadium Kobe; Kobe Universiade Memorial Stadium	1995
INAC Kobe Leonessa	Football	L. League	Noevir Stadium Kobe; Kobe Universiade Memorial Stadium	2001
Deução Kobe	Futsal	F. League	World Hall	1993
Kobelco Steelers	Rugby	Top League	Noevir Stadium Kobe; Kobe Universiade Memorial Stadium	1928
Hisamitsu Springs	Volleyball	V.Premier League	Kobe Green Arena	1948

Kobe hosted the 1985 Summer Universiade as well as the 1991 Men's Asian Basketball Championship, which was the qualifier for the 1992 Summer Olympics Basketball Tournament. Kobe was one of the host cities of the 2002 FIFA World Cup, hosting matches at Noevir Stadium Kobe (then known as Wing Stadium Kobe), which was renovated to increase its capacity to 40,000 for the event. Kobe was one of the host cities for the official 2006 Women's Volleyball World Championship.

Kobe also hosted the World Darts Federation World Cup in October 2017. The event was held in the Exhibition Hall in Port Island with over 50 countries competing.

== Notable people ==
- The Georgian-born Australian ocean rower and Soviet defector Michael 'Tarzan' Fomenko (c.1930–2018) lived with his family in the city for a period during the 1930s

== International relations ==
Sister cities

Kobe's sister cities are:

- Barcelona, Catalonia, Spain (1993)
- Brisbane, Queensland, Australia (1985)
- Incheon, South Korea (2010)
- Genoa, Liguria, Italy (1963)
- Marseille, Provence-Alpes-Côte d'Azur, France (1961)
- Riga, Latvia (1974)
- Rio de Janeiro, Brazil (1969)
- Seattle, WA, United States (1957)
- Tianjin, China (1973)
- Aberdeen, Scotland (2022)

Friendship and cooperation cities Kobe also cooperates with:

- Daegu, South Korea (2010)
- Faisalabad, Punjab, Pakistan (2000)
- Kigali, Rwanda (2016)
- Philadelphia, PA, United States (1986)

A memorandum of understanding on the possible establishment of sister city relations in the future was concluded in 2019 with Ahmedabad, Gujarat, India.

Sister ports The Port of Kobe's sister ports are:

- Port of Rotterdam, Netherlands (1967)
- Port of Seattle, United States (1967)
- Port of Tianjin, China

== Gallery ==
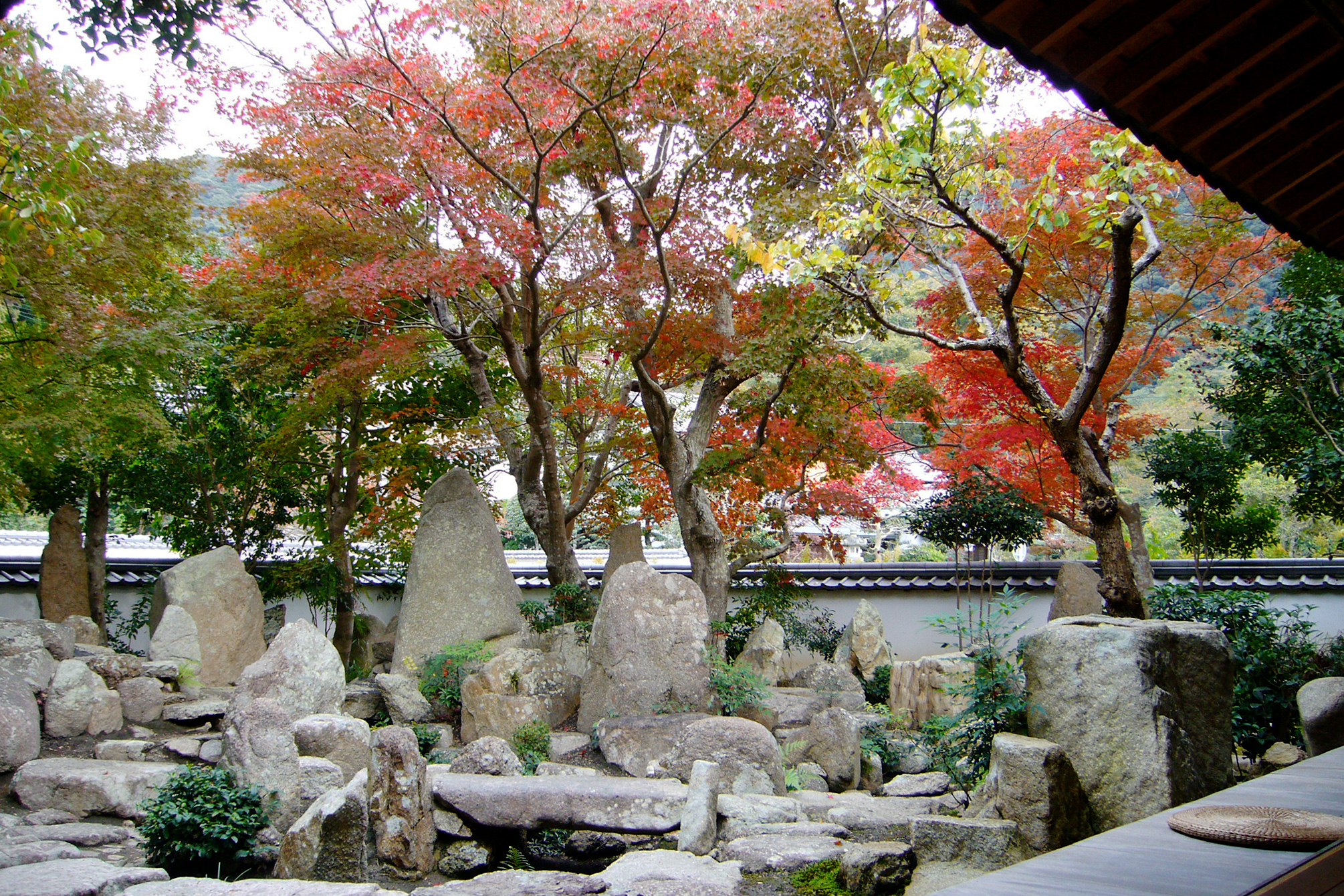
An'yō-in. Its karesansui is one of Japan's Places of Scenic Beauty.

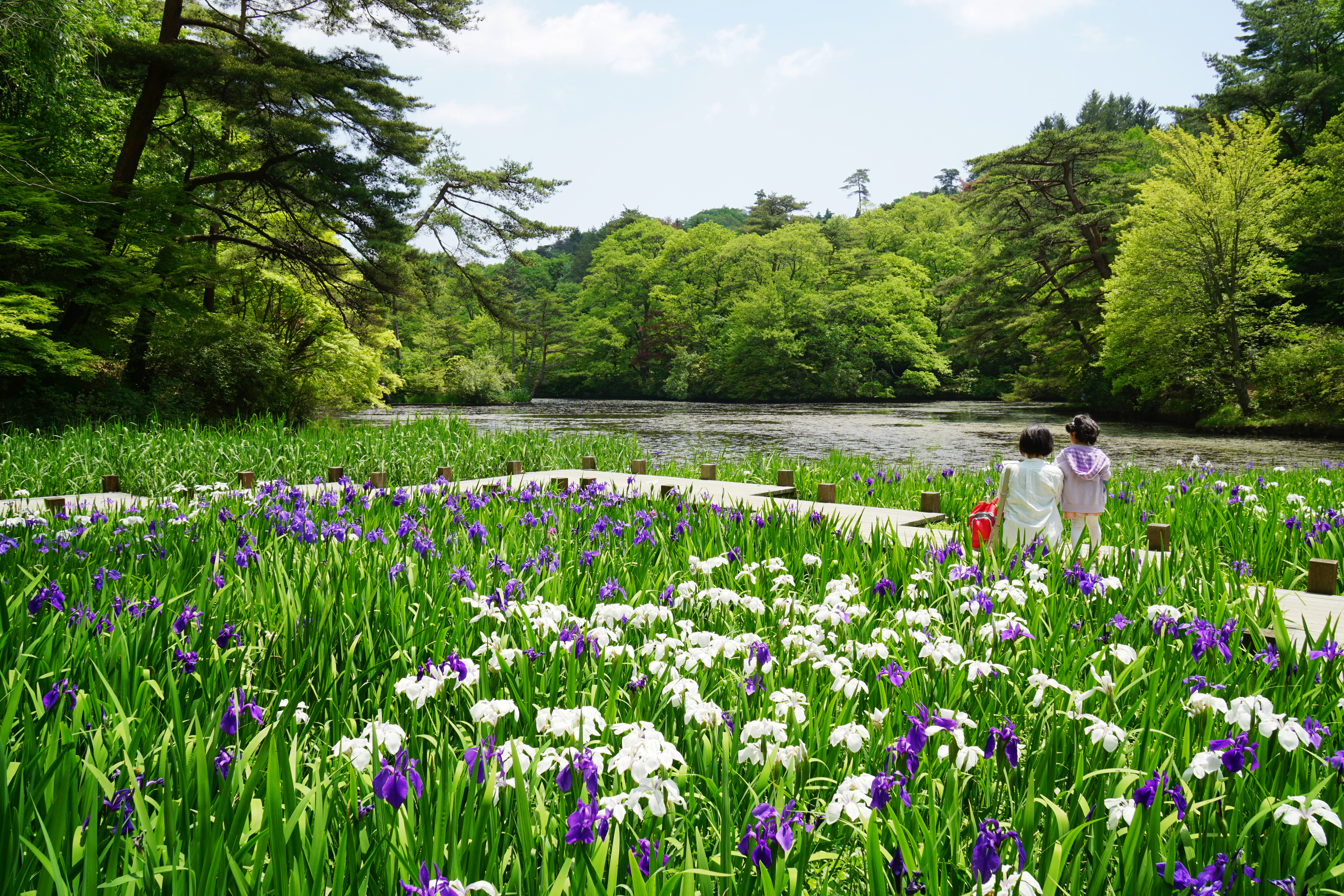
Kobe Municipal Arboretum

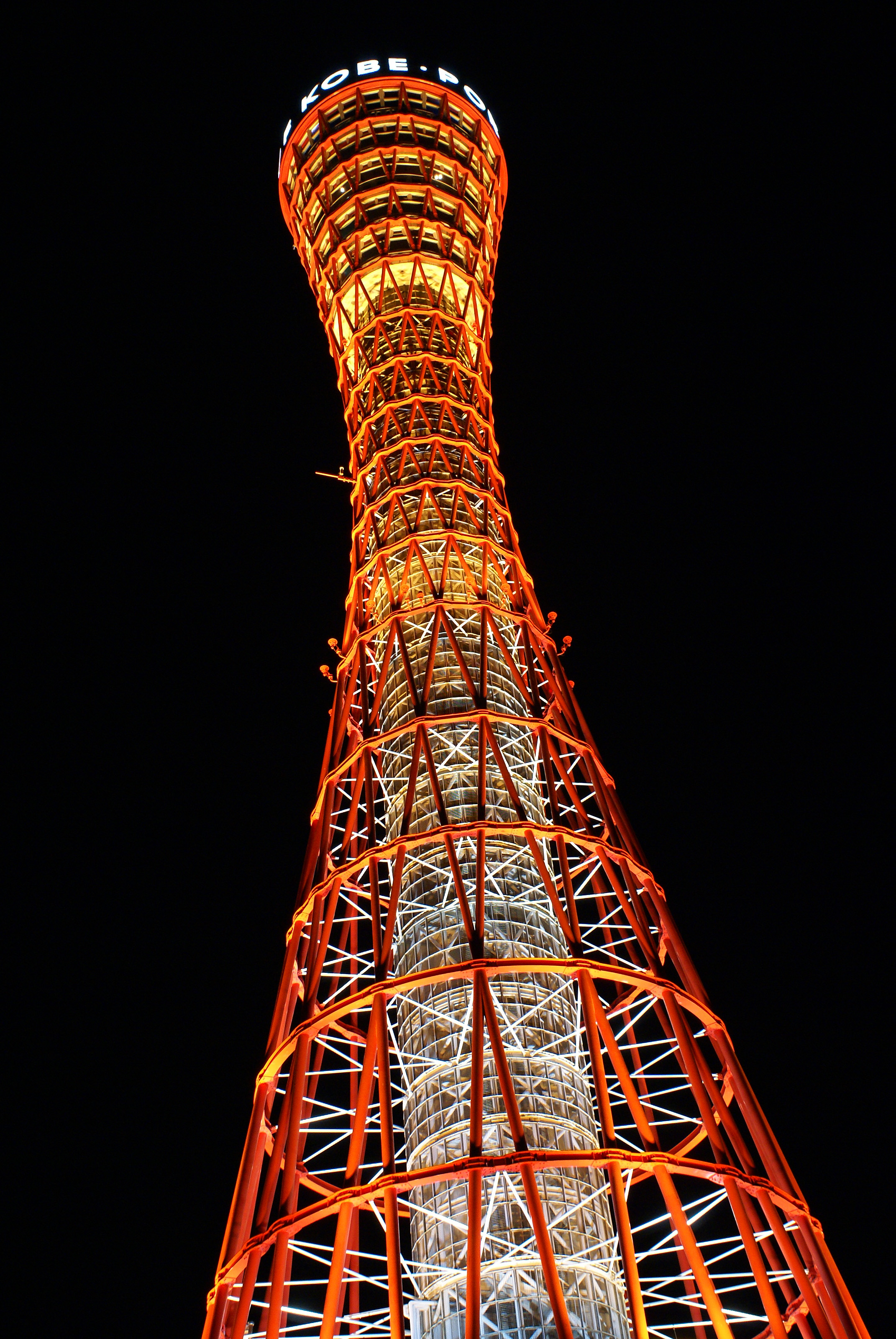
Kobe Port Tower

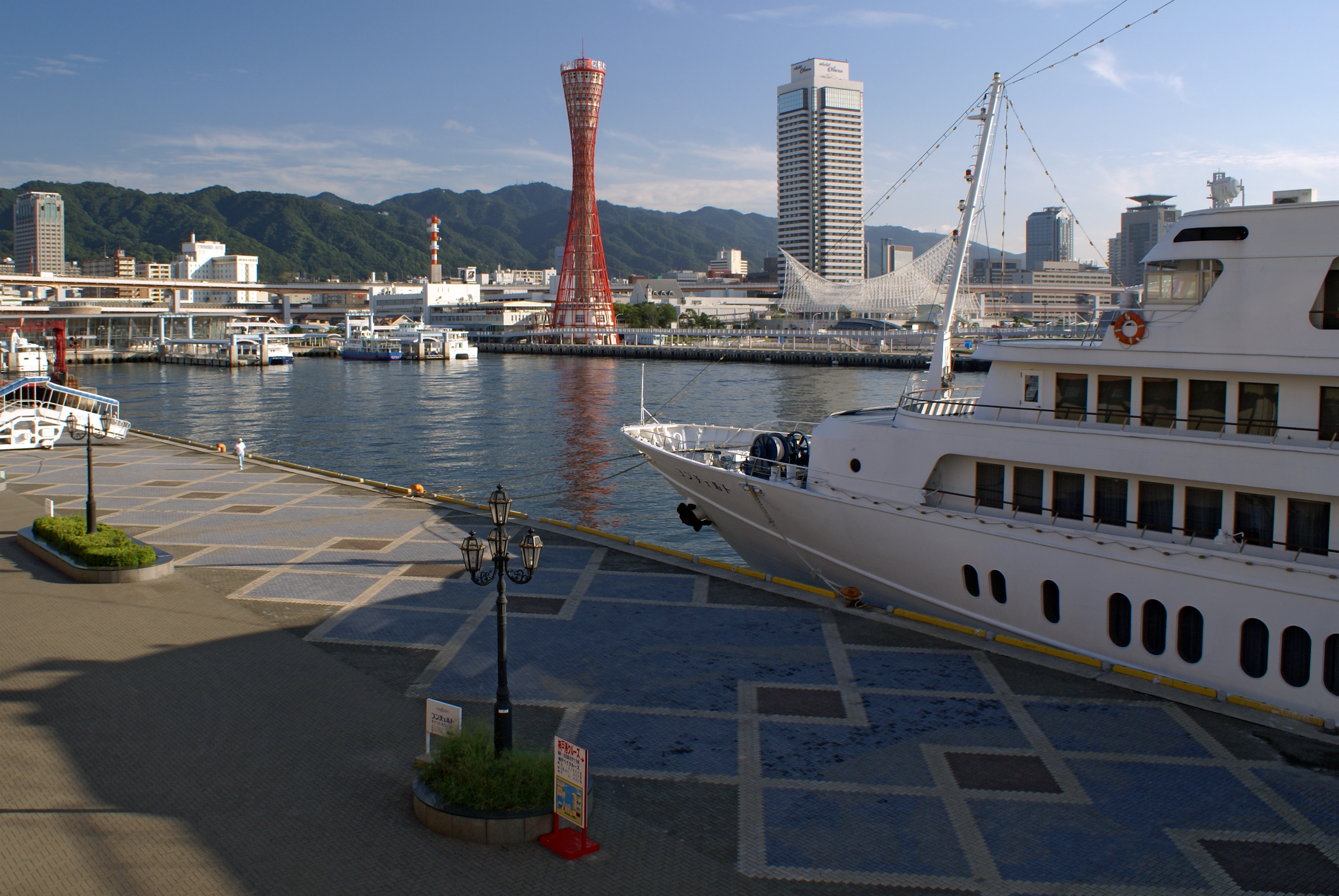
Harborland

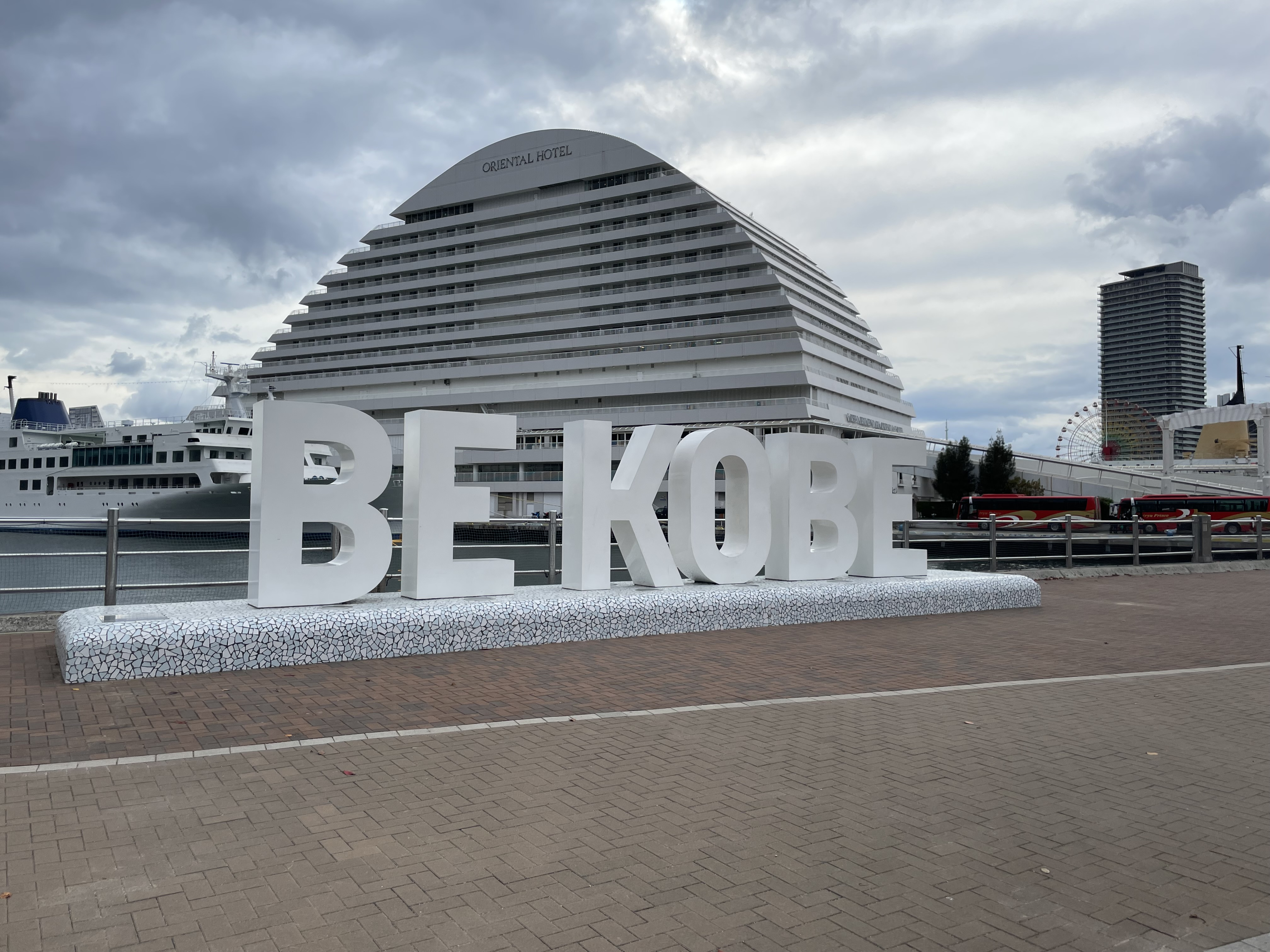
"Be Kobe" sign near Harborland

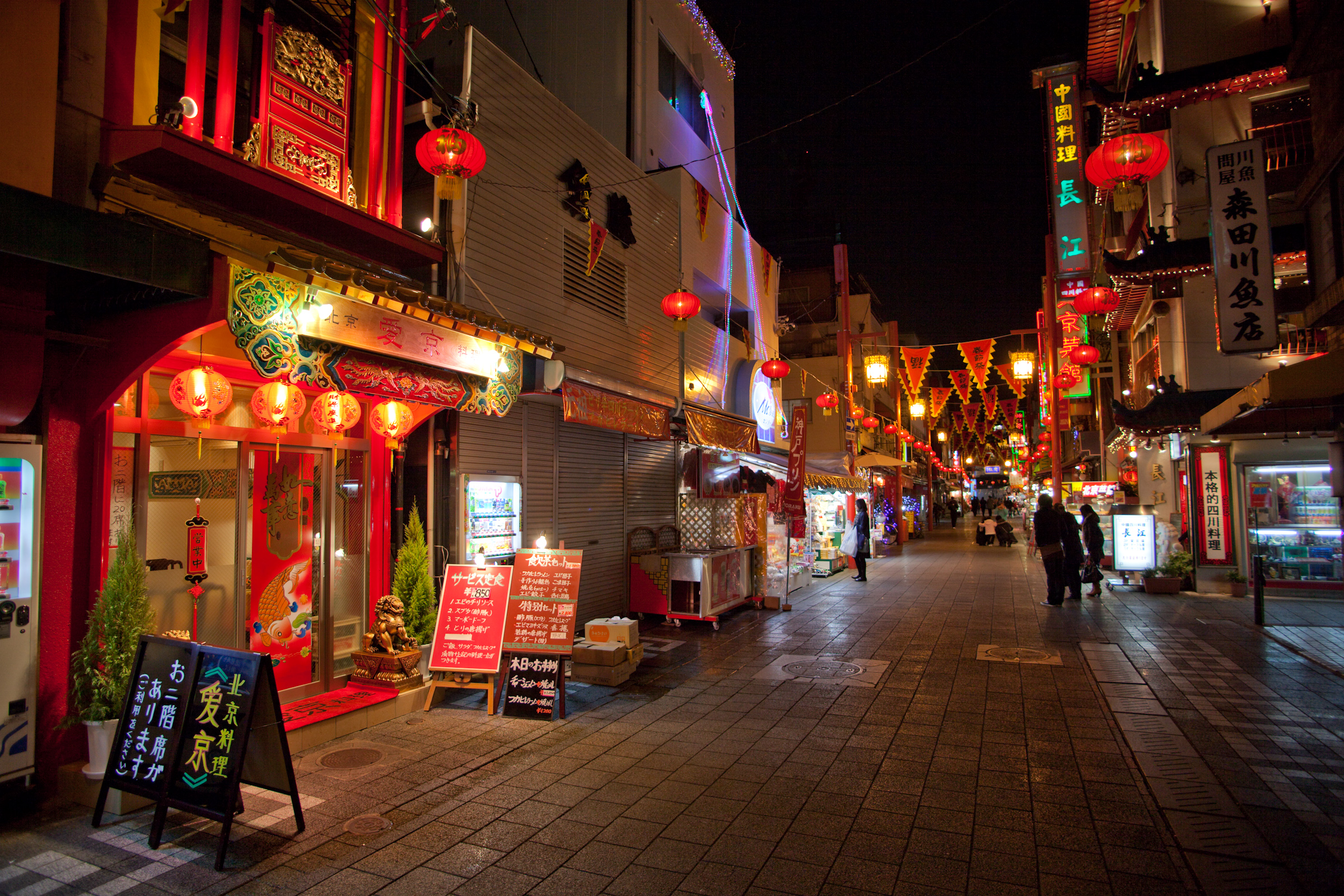
Nankin-machi, Motomachi

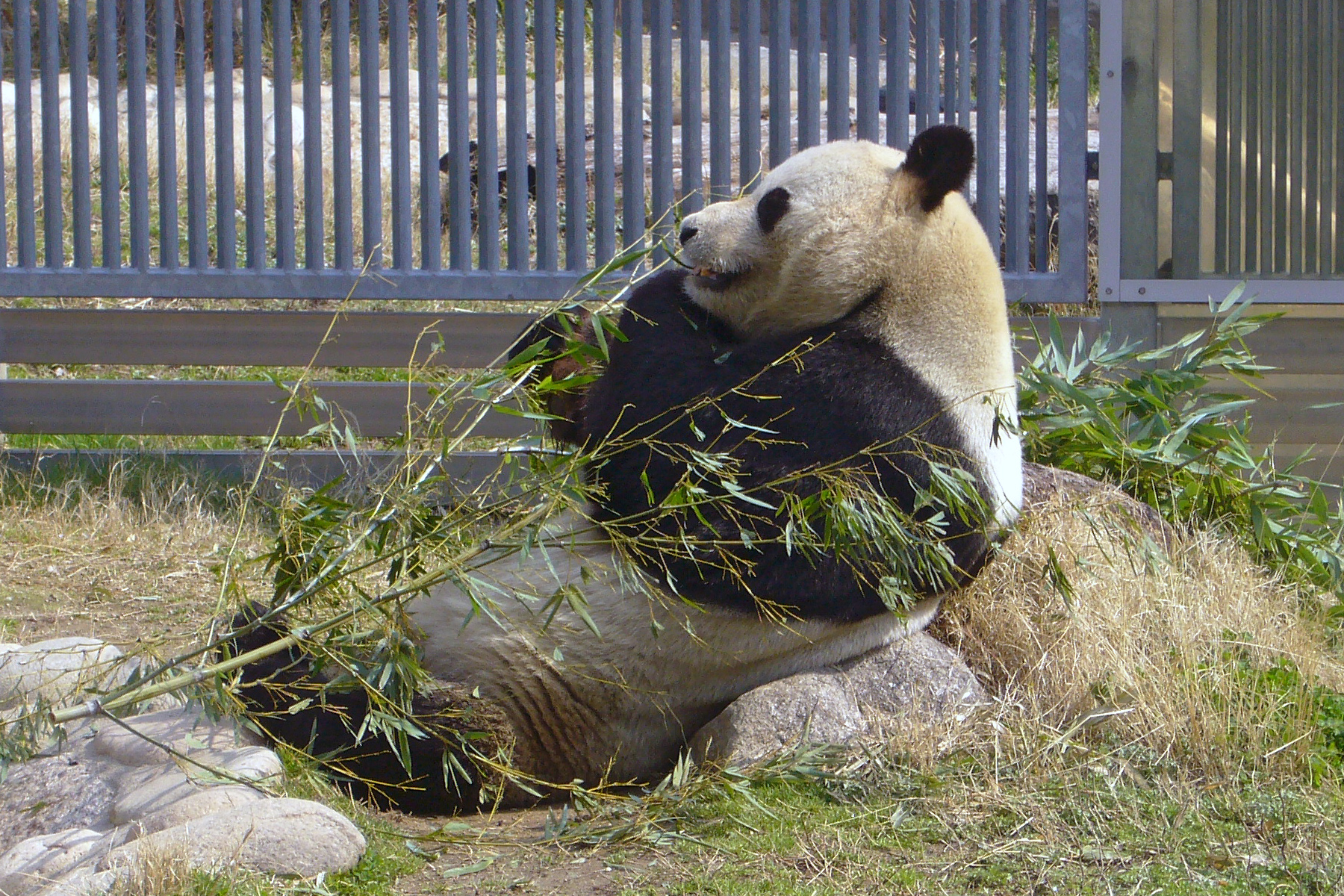
Kobe Oji Zoo as home of the giant and red pandas

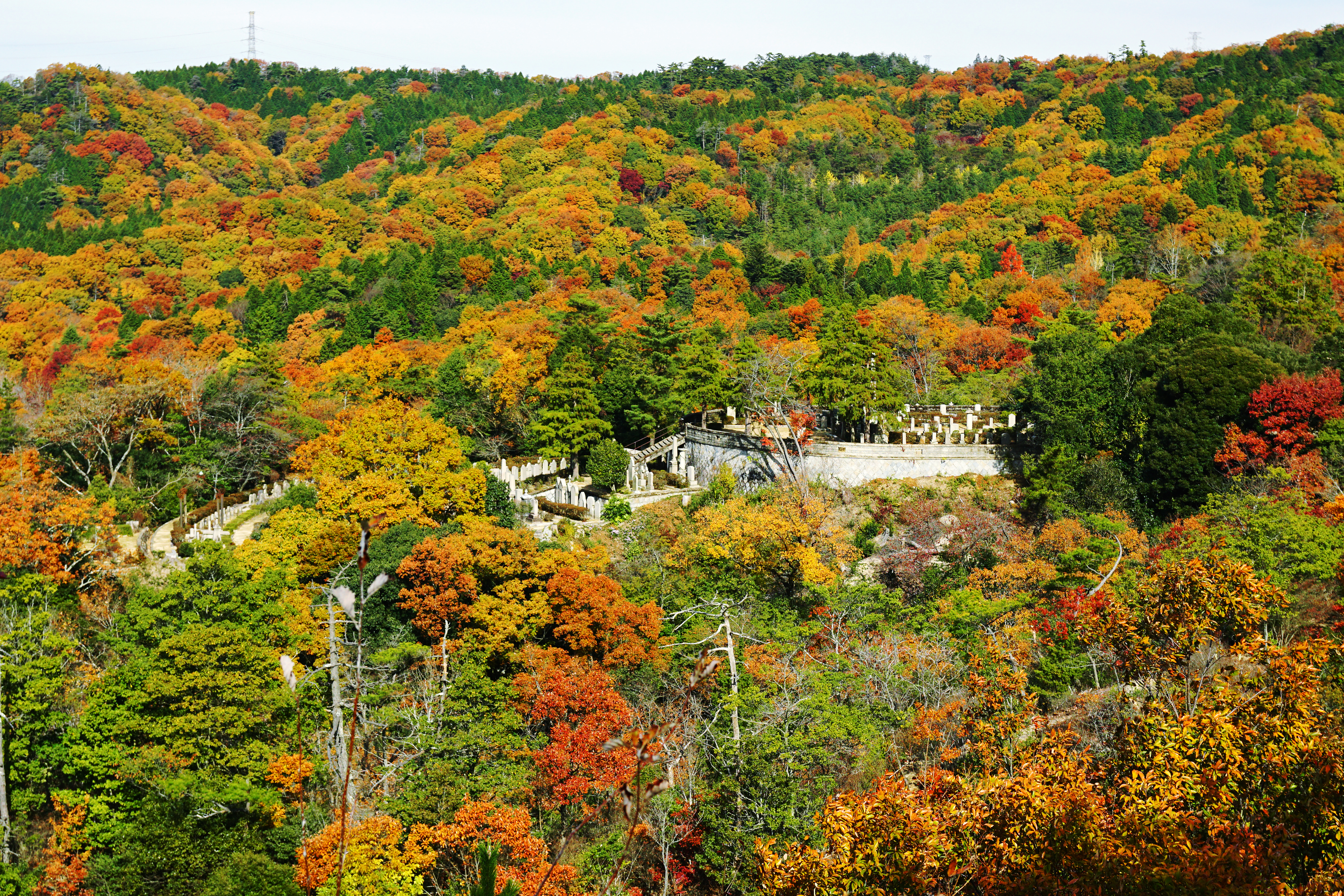
Foreigners' cemetery on the slopes of Futatabiyama

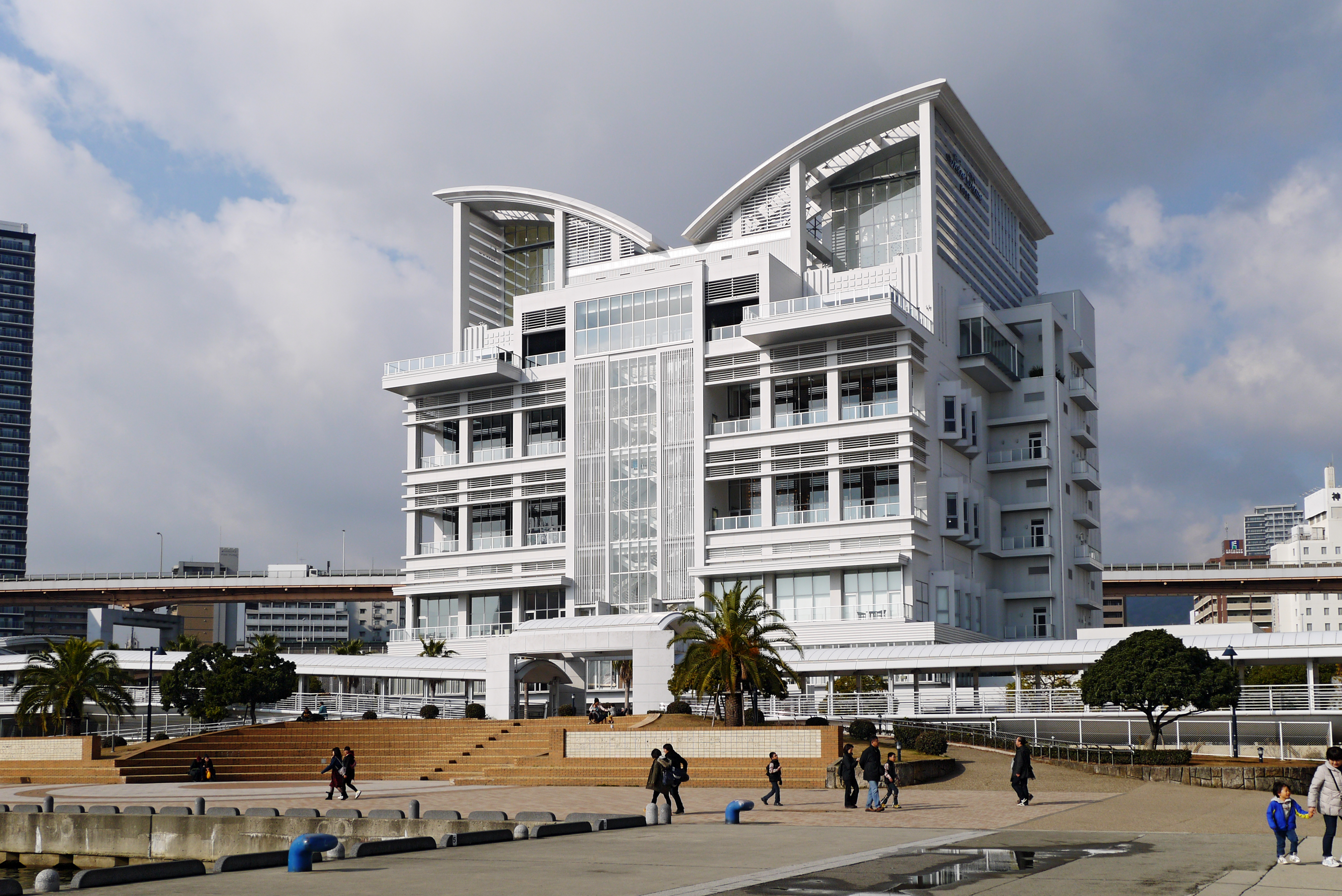
Notre Dame Kobe Wedding Hall

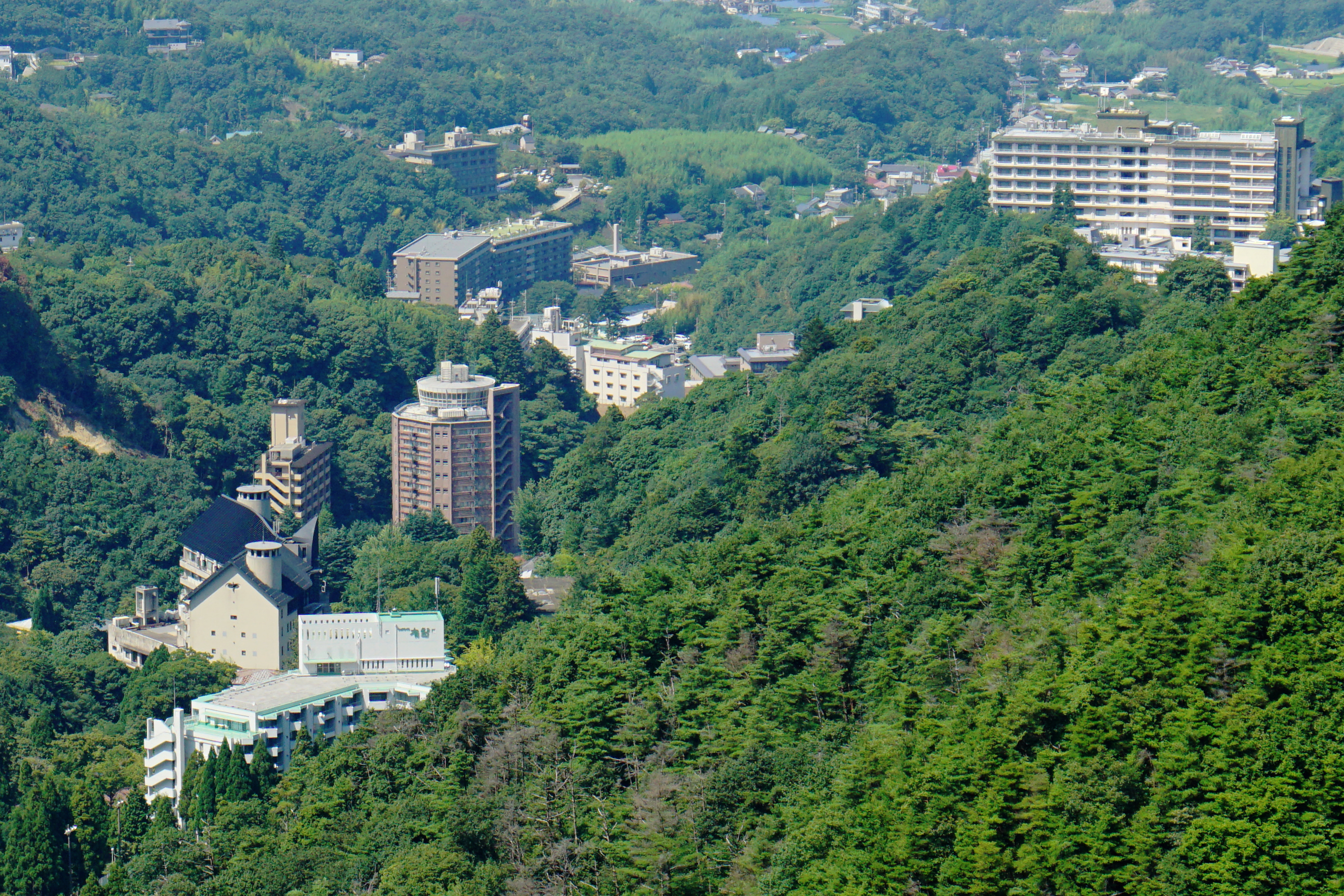
Arima Onsen located north of Kobe

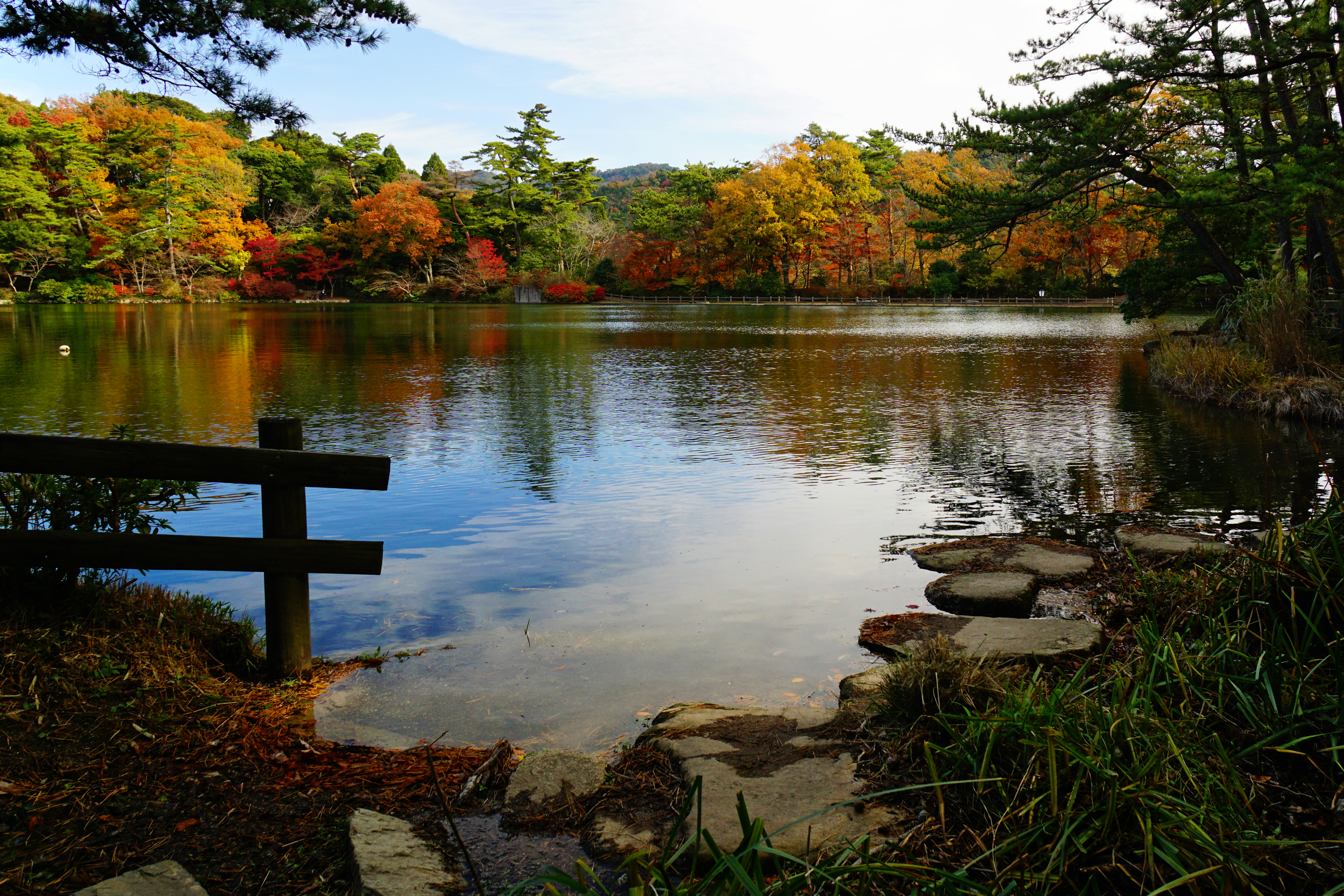
Futatabi Park located Mount Rokkō
