= Timeline of Kobe =

The following is a timeline of the history of the city of Kobe, Japan.

== Prior to 20th century ==
- 3rd century CE – Ikuta Shrine founded.
- 1868
  - Port of Kobe opens.
  - Hiogo and Osaka Herald English-language newspaper begins publication.
- 1870 – Kobe Regatta & Athletic Club established.
- 1872 – Minatogawa Shrine established.
- 1878 – Kobe Chamber of Commerce and Industry founded.
- 1884 – Kobe Yushin Nippo (newspaper) begins publication.
- 1887 – Population: 103,969.
- 1889 – Tōkaidō Main Line railway (Tokyo-Kobe) begins operating.
- 1893 – Population: 153,382.
- 1896 – Kinetoscope demonstrated at the Shinko Club.
- 1898
  - Kobe Shimbun (newspaper) begins publication.
  - Population: 215,780.

== 20th century ==
- 1902
  - Kobe Higher Commercial School founded.
  - Kawasaki Dockyard built.
- 1903
  - Kobe Golf Club formed.
  - Population: 283,839.
- 1905 – Kobe Seikosho in business.
- 1907 – City emblem designed.
- 1908 – Population: 378,197.
- 1913 – Population: 442,167.
- 1918 – Population: 592,726.
- 1920 – Population: 664,471.
- 1921 – Kobe Light Wave Society formed.
- 1925 – Population: 644,212.
- 1926 – Kobe Electric Railway established.
- 1930 – Ashiya Camera Club formed.
- 1931 – Nishi city ward established.
- 1933
  - Hyōgo city ward established.
  - Port Festival begins.
- 1935 – Population: 912,179
- 1936
  - Railway Sannomiya Station in operation.
  - Kobe Bank established.
- 1938 – Flooding.
- 1939 – Kawasaki Heavy Industries in business.
- 1940 – Population: 967,234.
- 1942 – April 18: Aerial bombing by US forces.
- 1945
  - March 16–17: Bombing of Kobe in World War II.
  - Population: 379,166.
- 1946 – Tarumi city ward and Kobe Municipal College of Foreign Affairs established.
- 1949 – Kobe University established.
- 1950
  - November: Korean-related 1950 Nagata incident occurs.
  - Population: 765,435.
- 1951 – Kobe Oji Zoo founded.
- 1955 – Population: 979,920.
- 1956 – Kobe designated a government ordinance city.
- 1957 – Sister city relationship established with Seattle, USA.
- 1963 – Kobe Port Tower built.
- 1967 – Kobe Carnival begins.
- 1970 – Hyogo Prefectural Museum of Modern Art opens.
- 1971 – Kobe Matsuri (festival) begins.
- 1972 – Sanyō Shinkansen (hi-speed train) begins operating; Shin-Kobe Station opens.
- 1975
  - Nuclear-armed vessels prohibited from Kobe Port.
  - Nishiyama Memorial Hall built.
  - Population: 1,360,000.
- 1977 – Subway Seishin-Yamate Line begins operating.
- 1981 – The first fully Automated guideway transit driverless people mover train technology introduced on Port Island Line.
- 1981 – Kobe Convention Complex opens.
- 1982 – Kobe City Museum opens.
- 1988 – Subway Hokushin Line begins operating.
- 1989 – Kobe City Hall built.
- 1991 – Kobe Fashion Mart built.
- 1993 – Artificial Rokkō Island created.
- 1995
  - 17 January: The 6.9 M_{w} Great Hanshin earthquake shakes the southern Hyōgo Prefecture with a maximum Shindo of VII, leaving 5,502–6,434 people dead, and 251,301–310,000 displaced in the region.
  - June: Post-earthquake city "Restoration Plan" published.
  - December: Kobe Luminarie festival begins.
  - Kobe Meriken Park Oriental Hotel in business.
- 1996
  - October: Earthquake-damaged Hanshin Expressway rebuilt.
  - Animation Kobe event begins.
- 1997 – Eco Asia meets in Kobe.
- 1998 – Akashi Kaikyō Bridge built.
- 2000 – Population: 1,493,595.

== 21st century ==
- 2001 – Subway Kaigan Line begins operating; Harborland Station opens.
- 2002 – Hyōgo Prefectural Museum of Art building opens.
- 2006 – Kobe Airport opens.
- 2007 – Kobe Planet Film Archive opens.
- 2010 – Population: 1,544,200.
- 2013
  - Kizō Hisamoto becomes mayor.
  - Umie Mosaic opens.

== See also ==
- Kobe history
- Timeline of Kobe (in Japanese)
- List of mayors of Kobe

== Bibliography ==
Published in the 20th century

- "Kōbe", Handbook for Travellers in Japan (9th ed.), London: J. Murray, 1913, hdl:2027/nnc1.50290956
- T. Philip Terry (1914), "Kobe", Terry's Japanese Empire, Boston: Houghton Mifflin, LCCN 14005129
- Robert P. Porter (1915), "Ports and Other Cities: (Kobe)", Japan, the New World-Power (2nd ed.), London: Oxford University Press
- Inoue Nobutaka; et al. (1979). "A Festival with Anonymous Kami: the Kobe Matsuri". Japanese Journal of Religious Studies. 6 (1/2): 163–185. doi:10.18874/jjrs.6.1-2.1979.163-185. JSTOR 30233196.
- Kobe City Restoration Plan, Kobe City, 1995
- Catherine Bauman (1998). Challenge of Land Use Planning After Urban Earthquakes: Observations from the Great Hanshin Earthquake of 1995. USA: Earthquake Engineering Research Institute. ISBN 978-0-7881-8378-2.

Published in the 21st century

- George Horwich (2000). "Economic Lessons of the Kobe Earthquake". Economic Development and Cultural Change. 48 (3): 521–542. doi:10.1086/452609. JSTOR 10.1086/452609. S2CID 154588521.
- Kobe: Developing a Resilient City (PDF), Local Strategies for Accelerating Sustainability, International Council for Local Environmental Initiatives-Canada, 2002 – via United Nations Public Administration Network, "Case Study #80"
- Robert B. Olshansky; et al. (2006). "Rebuilding Communities Following Disaster: Lessons from Kobe and Los Angeles". Built Environment. 32 (4): 354–374. doi:10.2148/benv.32.4.354. JSTOR 23289510.
- Richard Tames (2008). "Historical Gazetteer: Kobe". A Traveller's History of Japan (4th ed.). USA: Interlink Books. ISBN 978-1-56656-404-5.
- David W. Edgington (2010). Reconstructing Kobe: The Geography of Crisis and Opportunity. University of British Columbia Press. ISBN 978-0-7748-5941-7.
- Hugh Cortazzi, ed. (2012). "Kobe". Victorians in Japan: In and Around the Treaty Ports. Bloomsbury. pp. 157–. ISBN 978-1-78093-977-3. (first published in 1987)
