= Kobe Meriken Park Oriental Hotel =

Hotel in Kobe, Japan

Coordinates: 34°40′48″N 135°11′19″E

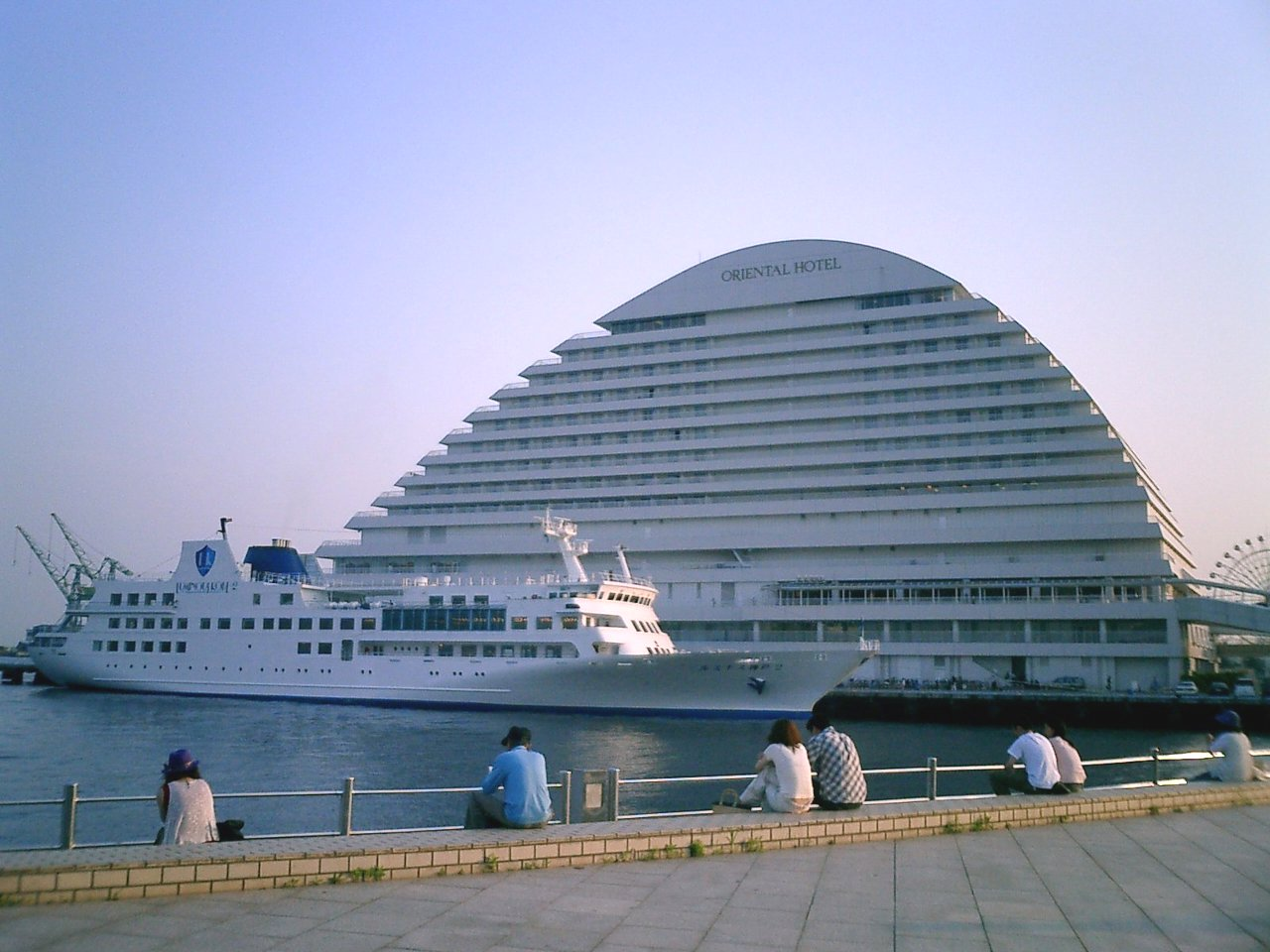
Kobe Meriken Park Oriental Hotel

Kobe Meriken Park Oriental Hotel (神戸メリケンパークオリエンタルホテル, Kōbe Meriken Pāku Orientaru Hoteru) is a hotel located close to Meriken Park in Kobe, Japan. It opened in June 1995, only 6 months after the Great Hanshin earthquake destroyed much of the city. It is in the Kobe waterfront area called Harborland and is often featured in pictures of Kobe, together with the Kobe Port Tower. It was designed by Takenaka Corporation to resemble a luxury liner. In 2003, it was owned by the Goldman Sachs Group. On February 15, 2006, Japan Hotel REIT Investment Corporation acquired the property for ¥11.4 billion ($7.6 million).

- Rooms: 331
- Floors: 14
- Ratings: AAA

== See also ==
- Port of Kobe
