= Kobe Maritime Museum =

Museum in Kobe, Japan

Coordinates: 34°40′58″N 135°11′18″E

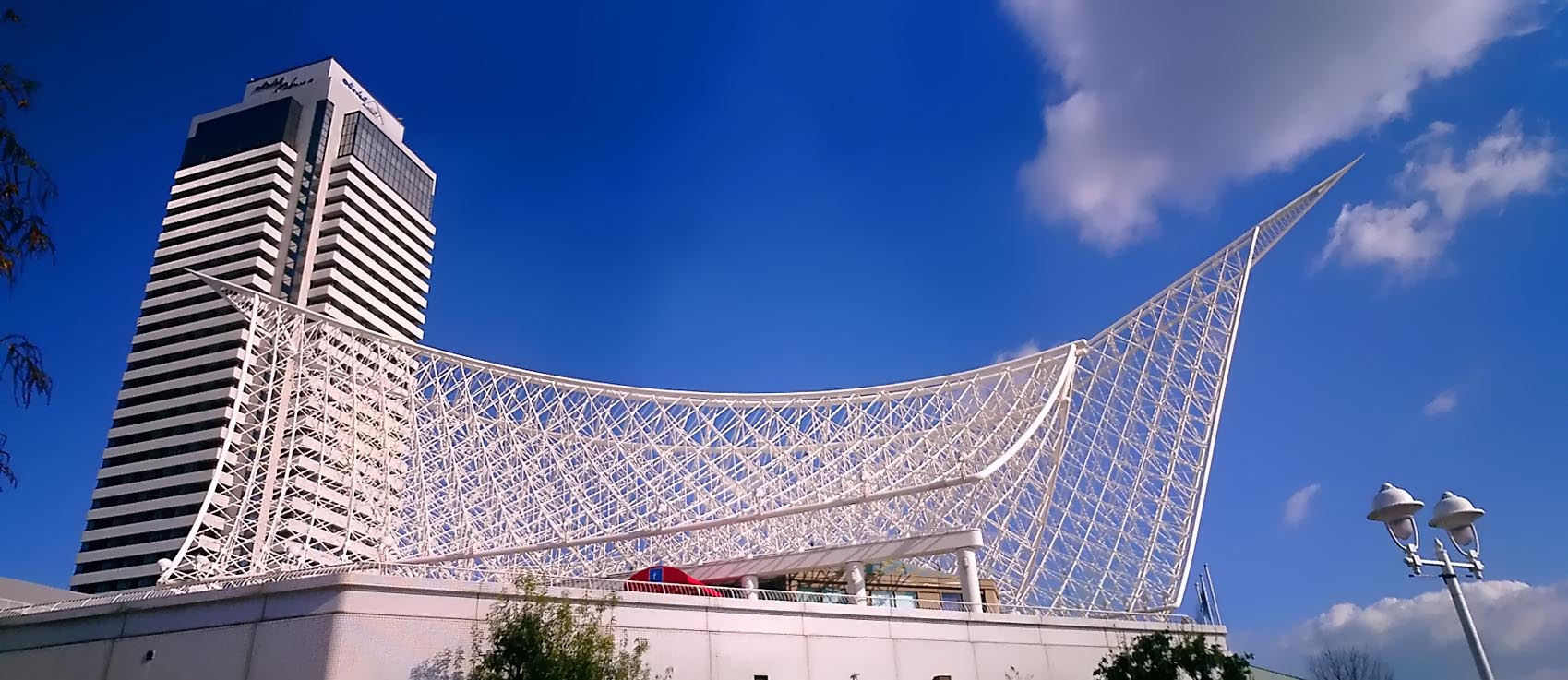
Kobe Maritime Museum features a roof design similar to a sailing ship.

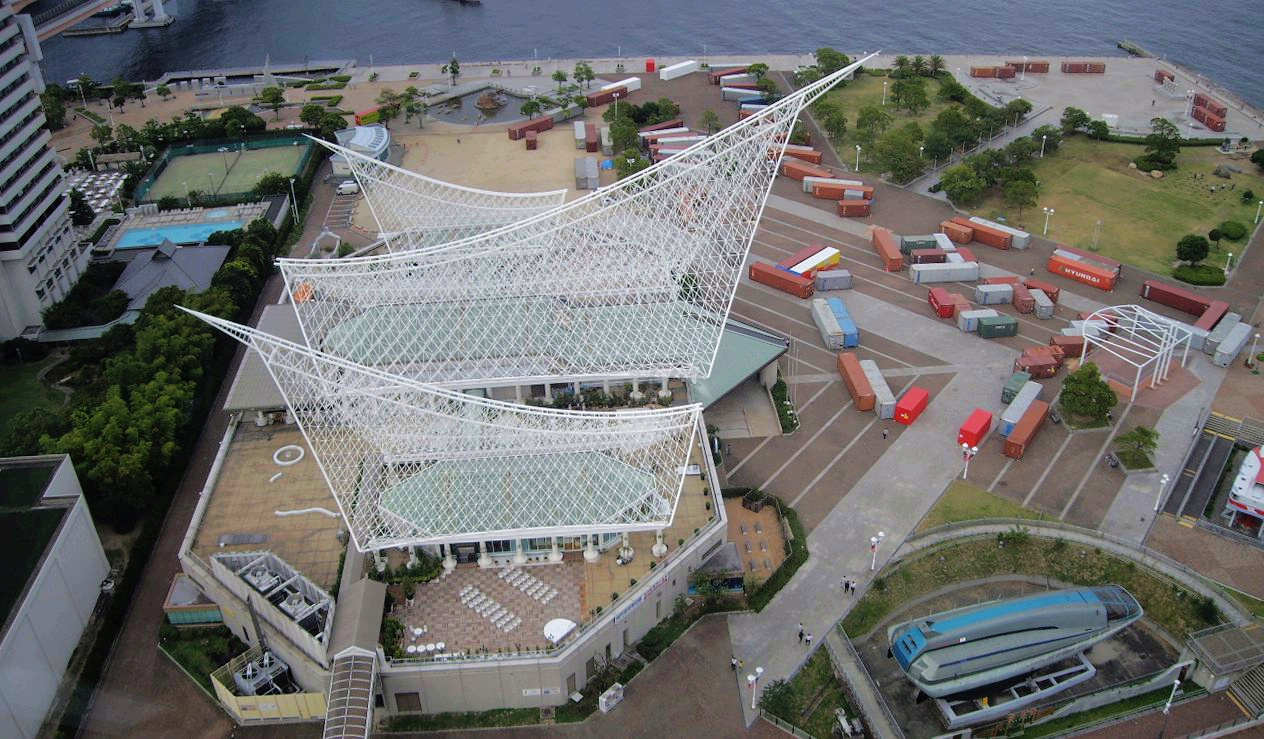
The Museum from above.

Kobe Maritime Museum is a museum in Kobe, Japan focusing on the history of Japanese shipping and Kobe harbor.

One of the former exhibits is the Yamato 1 removed in 2016 along with the TSL Hayate.

== See also ==
- Port of Kobe
- Meriken Park
- Kobe Port Tower
