= Sysmex Corporation =

Japanese company

- Type: Public (K.K)
- Traded as: TYO: 6869
- ISIN: JP3351100007
- Industry: Medical equipment and devices
- Founded: February 20, 1968
- Headquarters: Chuo-ku, Kobe, Hyogo Prefecture, Japan
- Area served: Worldwide
- Key people: Hisashi Ietsugu (Chairman and CEO)
- Products: Diagnostic instruments; Reagents; Health management support software
- Revenue: ▲JPY 8508.6 billion (FY 2025) (US$ 5.2 billion) (FY 2025)
- Net income: ▲JPY 41.2 billion (FY 2019) (US$ 388.2 million) (FY 2019)
- Number of employees: 11,457 (as of March 31, 2025)
- Website: Official website

Sysmex Corporation (シスメックス株式会社, Shisumekkusu Kabushiki-gaisha) is a Japanese company headquartered in Kobe that is engaged in the health care business. Originally called TOA Medical Electronics (a branch of the TOA Corporation), the Sysmex brand was established in 1978, and were mainly involved with haematology analysers. The company was renamed Sysmex Corporation in 1998 taking advantage of brand recognition of their machines.

== About the company ==
In addition, through its associated company, Sysmex is also engaged in the sale of extracorporeal diagnostic agents, as well as the import and sale of medical devices. The company distributes its products in the domestic market and to the overseas markets including the United States, Germany, the United Kingdom, China and Singapore, among others. It has offices and factories throughout Asia, as well as branches in Europe, Canada, United States, Australia and New Zealand. On April 1, 2011, Katakura Industries Co., Ltd. sold its biological science research department to the company. As of March 31, 2025, Sysmex reported having 79 global subsidiaries, and one associated company in total. They have reached an overseas sales ratio of 86.7% and over 190 export destinations.

== See also ==
- Medical technologist
- Automated analyzer
- Sysmex XE-2100
