= Chūō-ku, Kobe =

Chūō-ku 中央区
- Ward of Kobe
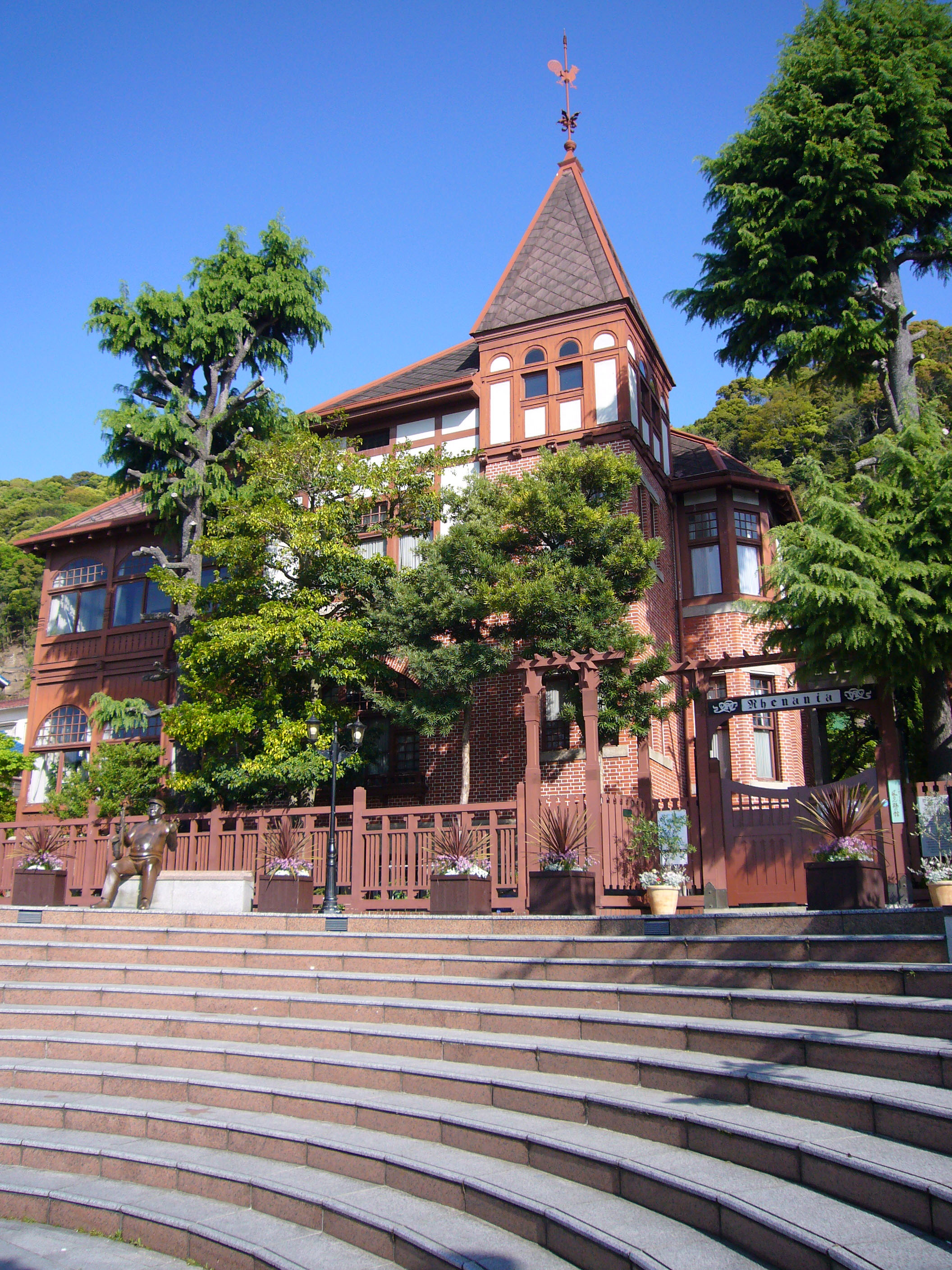
- Kobe Kitano weather vane house

- Location of Chūō-ku in Kobe

- Location within Kobe Location within Hyōgo Prefecture Location within Japan
- Coordinates: 34°41′26″N 135°11′45″E
- Country: Japan
- Region: Kinki (Kansai)
- Prefecture: Hyōgo
- City: Kobe

Area
  - Total: 28.46 km^{2} (10.99 sq mi)

Population (January 31, 2012)
  - Total: 127,602
  - Density: 4,483.56/km^{2} (11,612.4/sq mi)
- Time zone: UTC+9 (Japan Standard Time)
- Flower: Petunia
- Phone number: 078-232-1411
- Address: 5-1-1 Kumoi-dori, Chuo-ku, Kobe-shi, Hyogo-ken 651-8570
- Website: www.city.kobe.lg.jp/ward/kuyakusho/chuou/foreign/english/

Chūō (中央区, Chūō-ku) is one of 9 wards of Kobe, Japan. It has an area of 28.46 km^{2}, and a population of 127,602 with 74,814 households as of January 31, 2012. The ward was formed from the 1980 merger of the former Fukiai-ku (葺合区) and Ikuta-ku (生田区).

The Consulate-General of Panama in Kobe is located on the eighth floor of the Moriyama Building in Chūō-ku. Also in the ward are the headquarters of Sumitomo Rubber Industries, Sysmex Corporation, a global medical devices manufacturing company and TOA Corporation, an electronics company.

== Places of note ==
- Port of Kobe
- Port Island
- Kobe Port Tower
- Harborland
- Kobe Airport
- Sannomiya

== Education ==
International schools:

- Kobe Chinese School, a mainland China-oriented Chinese international school
- Kobe Korean Elementary and Junior High School (神戸朝鮮初中級学校), a North Korea-oriented Korean international school

== Gallery ==
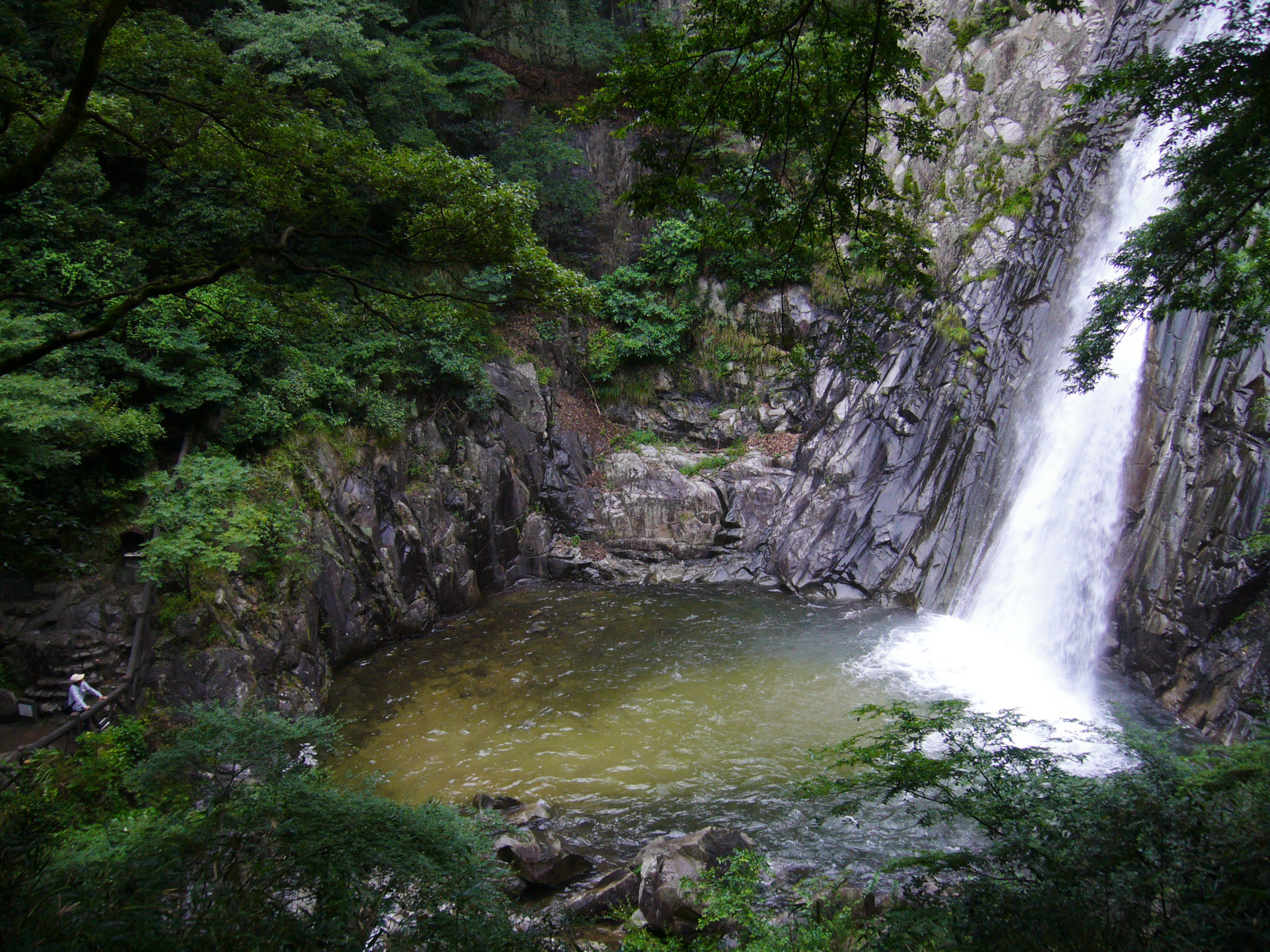
Nunobiki Falls

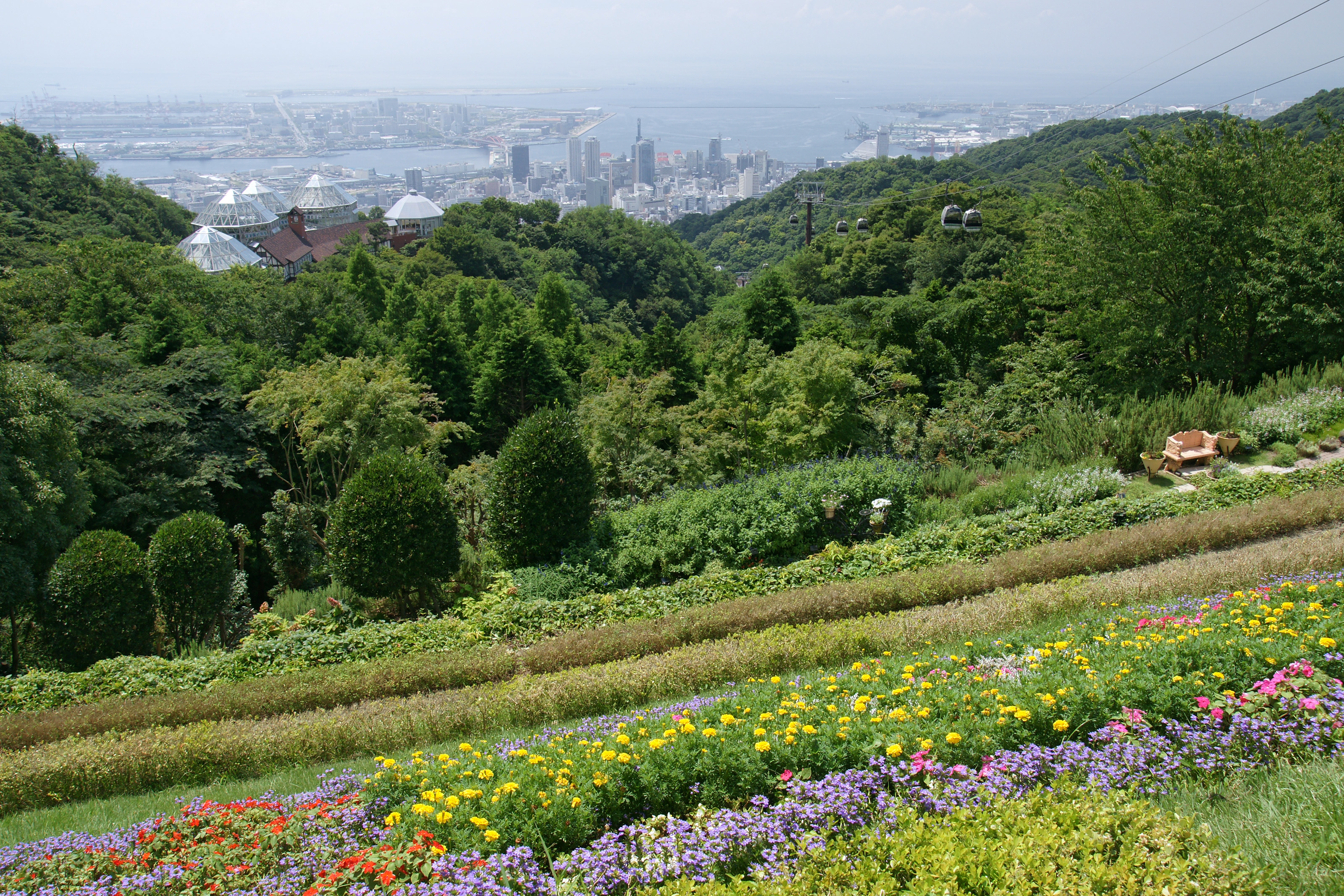
Kobe Nunobiki Herb Park

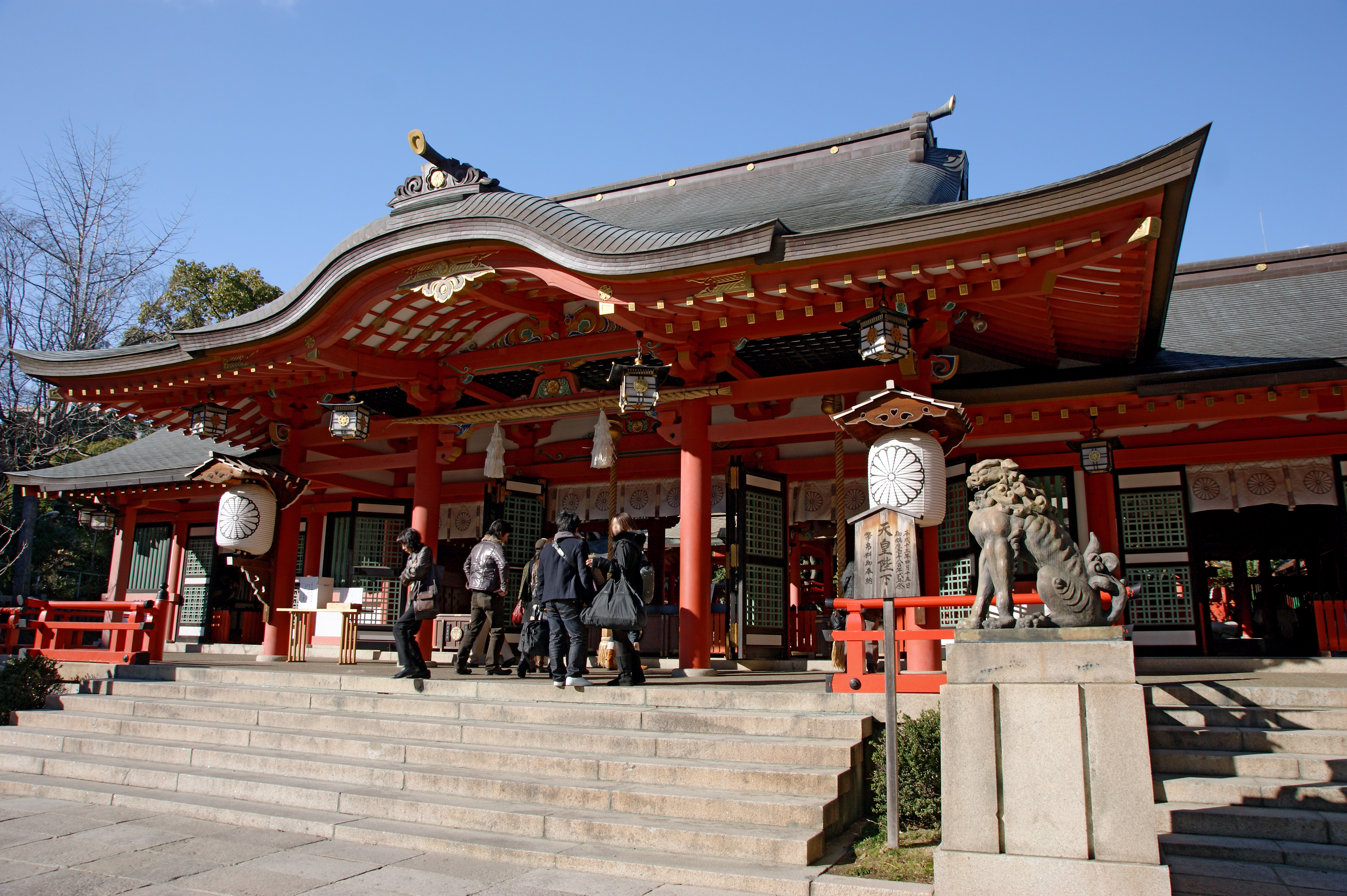
Ikuta shrine

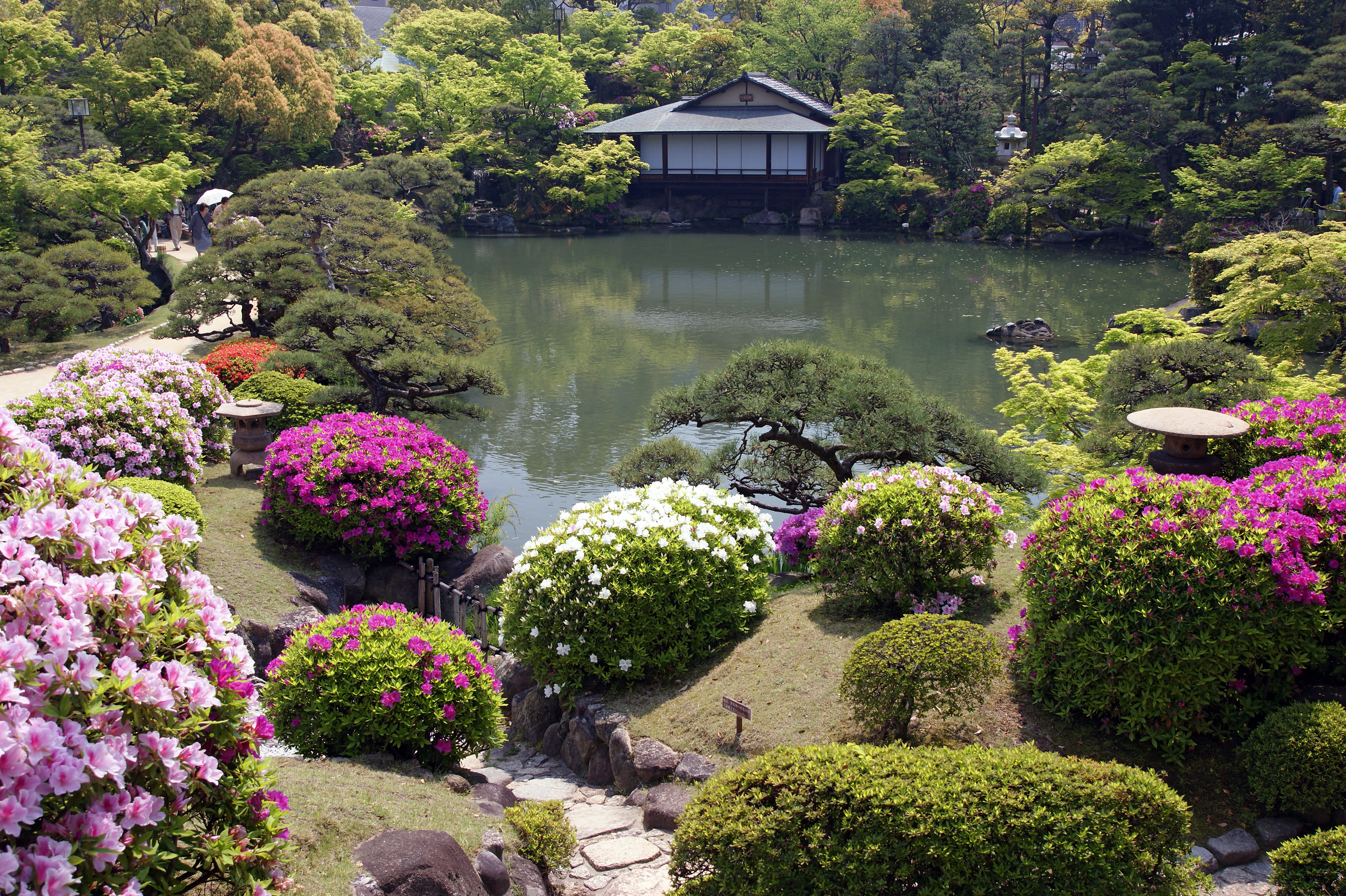
Kobe Sorakuen Park

== In popular culture ==
Ninomiya Shopping Arcade, located in the ward, was featured in the 2022 anime film Suzume.
