= Sysmex XE-2100 =

The Sysmex XE-2100 is a haematology automated analyser, used to quickly perform full blood counts and reticulocyte counts. It is made by the Sysmex Corporation. Its successor is the Sysmex XN-1000.

It can be run on its own, or connected to a blood film making and staining unit. Racks of blood go in on a tray on the right, and come out the left side. The racks hold ten 4.5 mL tubes, and have a notch so they can only go in one way.

As the tubes go through the machine, two are picked up and inverted five times to mix, the first one is sampled. They are put down again, the rack moves along one space and two more are picked up and mixed five times, this assures that each tube is inverted ten times before being sampled.

The caps are left on the tubes as they go through the machine. A piercer takes a sample through the rubber centre while the tube is upside down. EDTA (lavender) tubes are usually used, although citrate (blue top) tubes will also work (although the result must be corrected because of dilution).

Paediatric and oversized tubes can be put through manually via a sampler on the left-hand side of the machine.

Data from the XE-2100 can be viewed with a computer program.

== Price ==
This machine can be purchased for around US$107,000

== Principles of measurement ==
Blood is sampled and diluted, and moves through a tube thin enough that cells pass by one at a time. Characteristics about the cell are measured using lasers (fluorescence flow cytometry) or electrical impedance.

Because not everything about the cells can be measured at the same time, blood is separated into a number of different channels. In the XE-2100 there are five different channels: WBC/BASO, DIFF, IMI, RET and NRBC.

== See also ==
- Medical technologist
