= Meriken Park =

Park in Kobe, Japan

Coordinates: 34°40′54″N 135°11′18″E

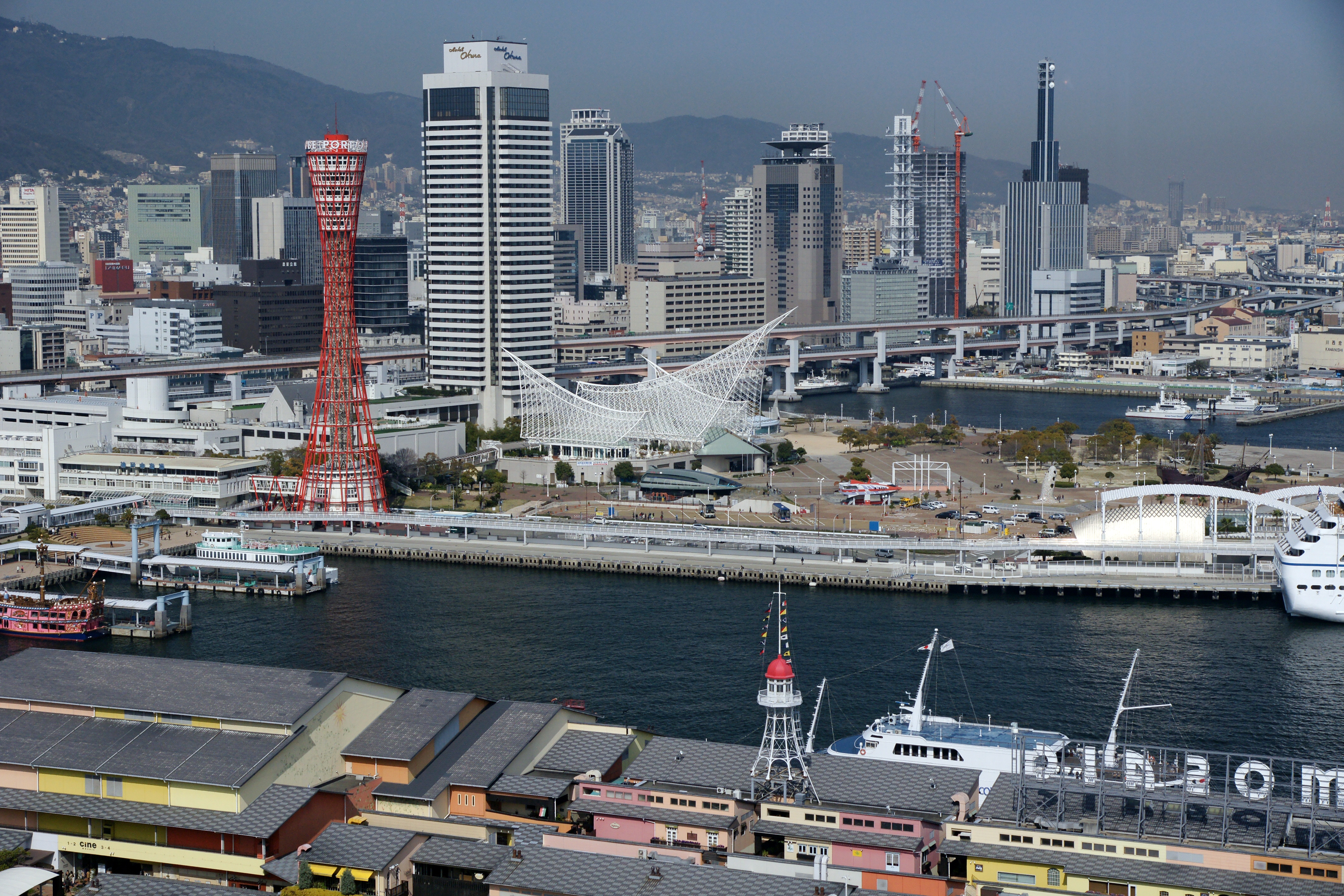
Harbor overview of Kobe's Meriken Park and the Kobe Port Tower.

Meriken Park (メリケンパーク, Meriken pāku) is a waterfront park located in the port city of Kobe, Hyōgo Prefecture, Japan. The park features the Kobe Port Tower, Kobe Maritime Museum, and a memorial to victims of the Great Hanshin earthquake. The name of the park comes from the word "American," which was commonly translated as "Meriken" during the Meiji era. Meriken Park is also the location of the Hotel Okura Kobe and Kobe Meriken Park Oriental Hotel.

== See also ==
- Port of Kobe
- Kobe
