= Yamato-1 =

Japanese ship by Mitsubishi

Coordinates: 34°40′56.38″N 135°11′15.82″E

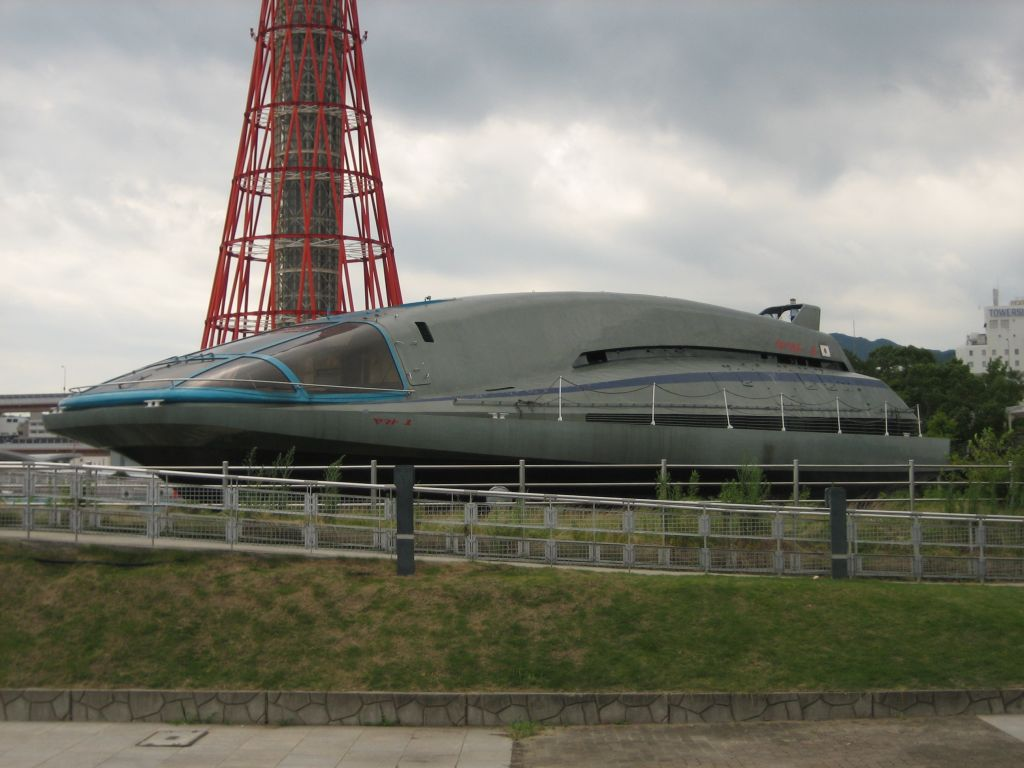
- Yamato-1 on display in Kobe, Japan

History

Japan
- Owner: Mitsubishi Heavy Industries
- Maiden voyage: June 1992
- Fate: demolished in 2016

General characteristics
- Type: experimental
- Displacement: 185 T (1,850,000 G)
- Length: 30 m (98 ft)
- Beam: 10.39 m (34.1 ft)
- Draft: 2.69 m (8 ft 10 in)
- Depth: 3.96 m (13.0 ft)
- Propulsion: 2x 4 T MHD thrusters, 8 kN thrust each.
- Speed: 8 kn (15 km/h; 9.2 mph)

Yamato-1 is a ship built in the early 1990s by Mitsubishi Heavy Industries, Ltd. at Wadasaki-cho Hyogo-ku, Kobe. It uses magnetohydrodynamic drives (MHDDs) driven by liquid helium-cooled superconductors and can travel at 15 kilometres per hour (8.1 kn).

Yamato-1 was the first working prototype of her kind. It was completed in Japan in 1991, by the Ship & Ocean Foundation (later known as the Ocean Policy Research Foundation). The ship, which includes two magnetohydrodynamic (MHD) thrusters, which have no moving parts, was first successfully operated in Kobe harbour in June 1992.

An MHDD works by applying a magnetic field to an electrically conducting fluid. The electrically conducting fluid used in the MHD thrusters of Yamato-1 was seawater.

In the 1990s, Mitsubishi built several prototypes of ships propelled by MHDD systems. Despite projected higher speeds, these ships were only able to reach speeds of 15 km/h due to constraints imposed by the weight of the superconducting magnets, and the relatively low system efficiency of 15%.

Afterwards, Yamato-1 was on display at the Kobe Maritime Museum, until it was demolished in 2016.

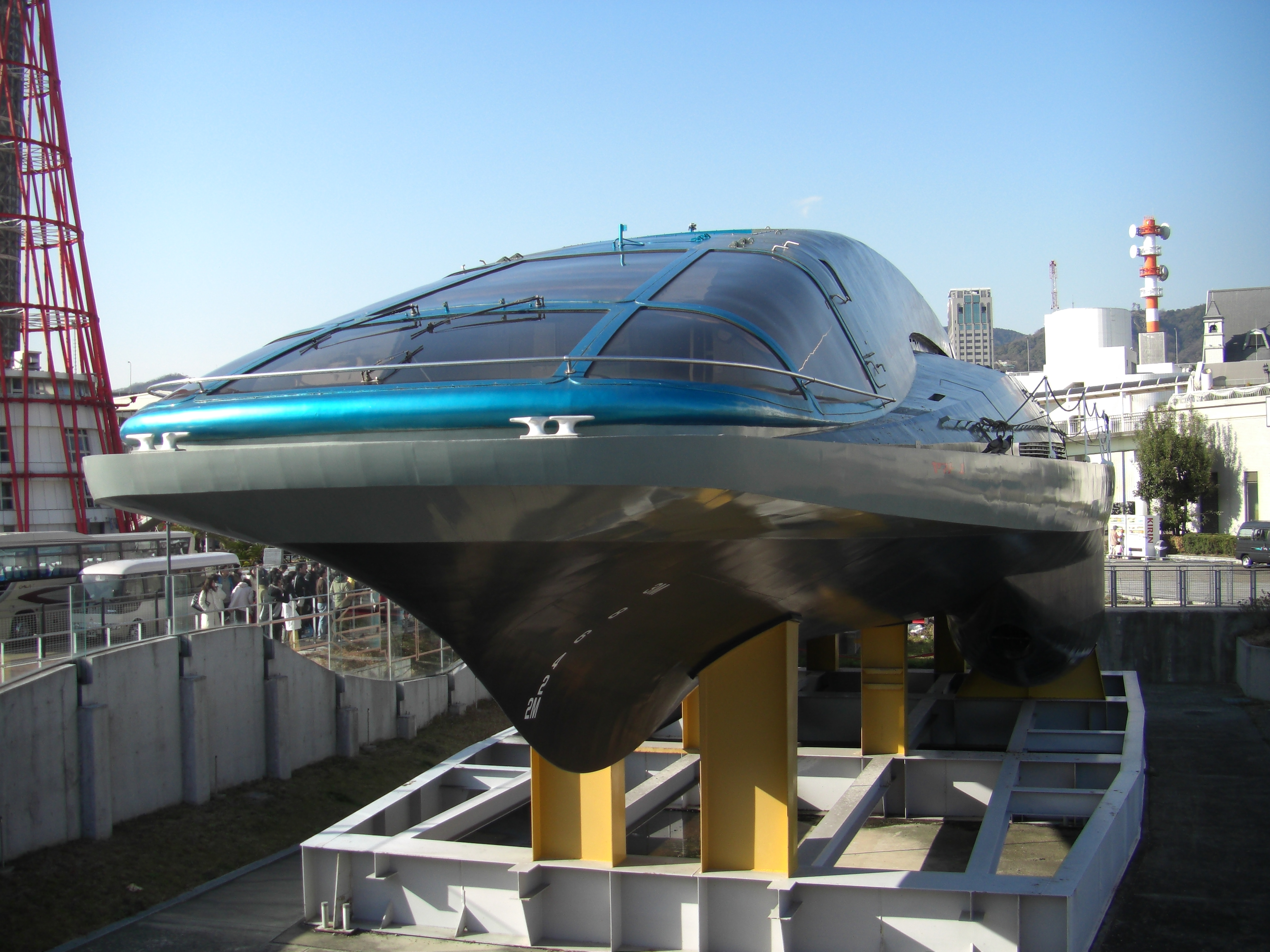
The front of Yamato-1

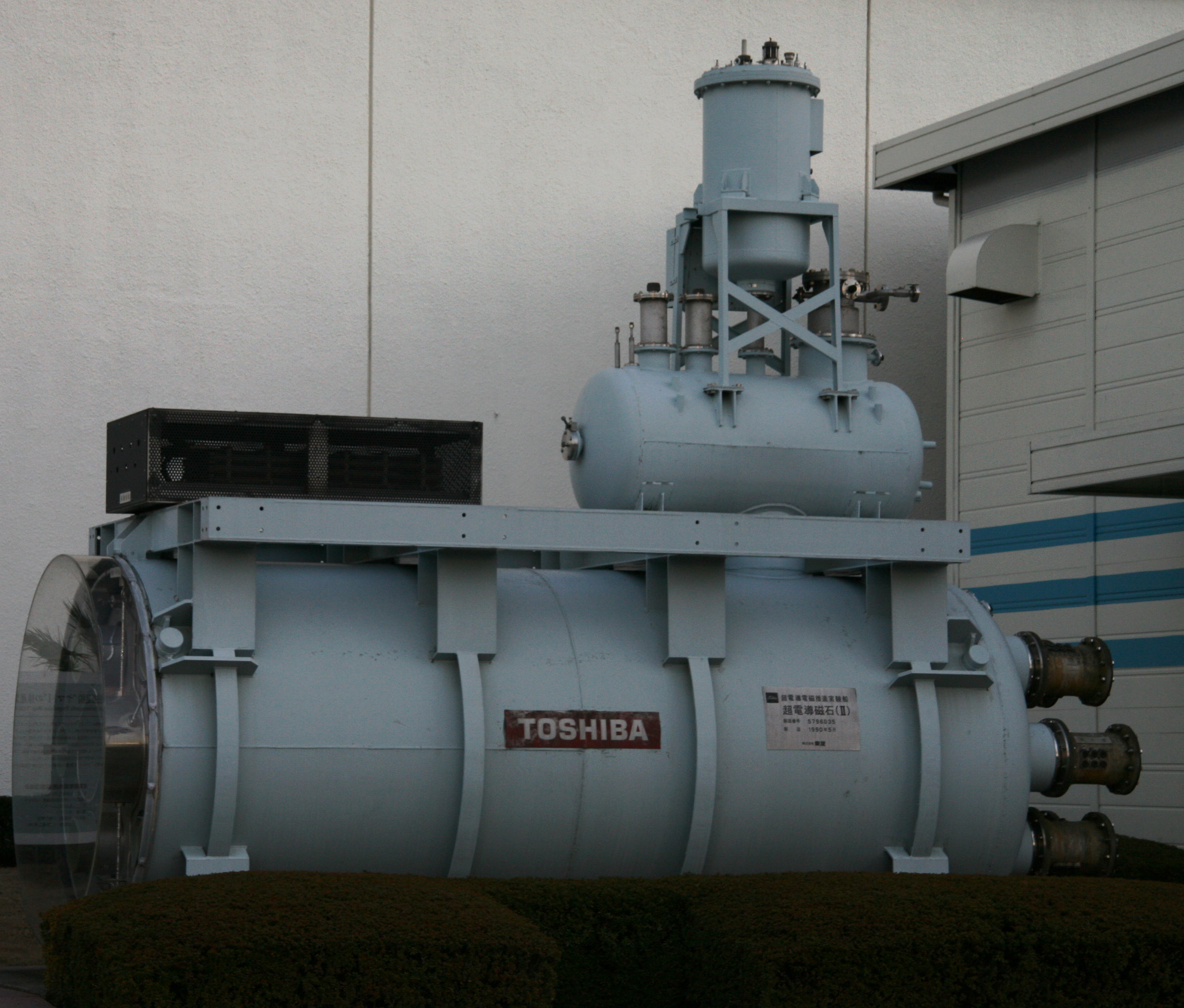
A MHD thruster from the boat, at the Ship Science Museum in Tokyo

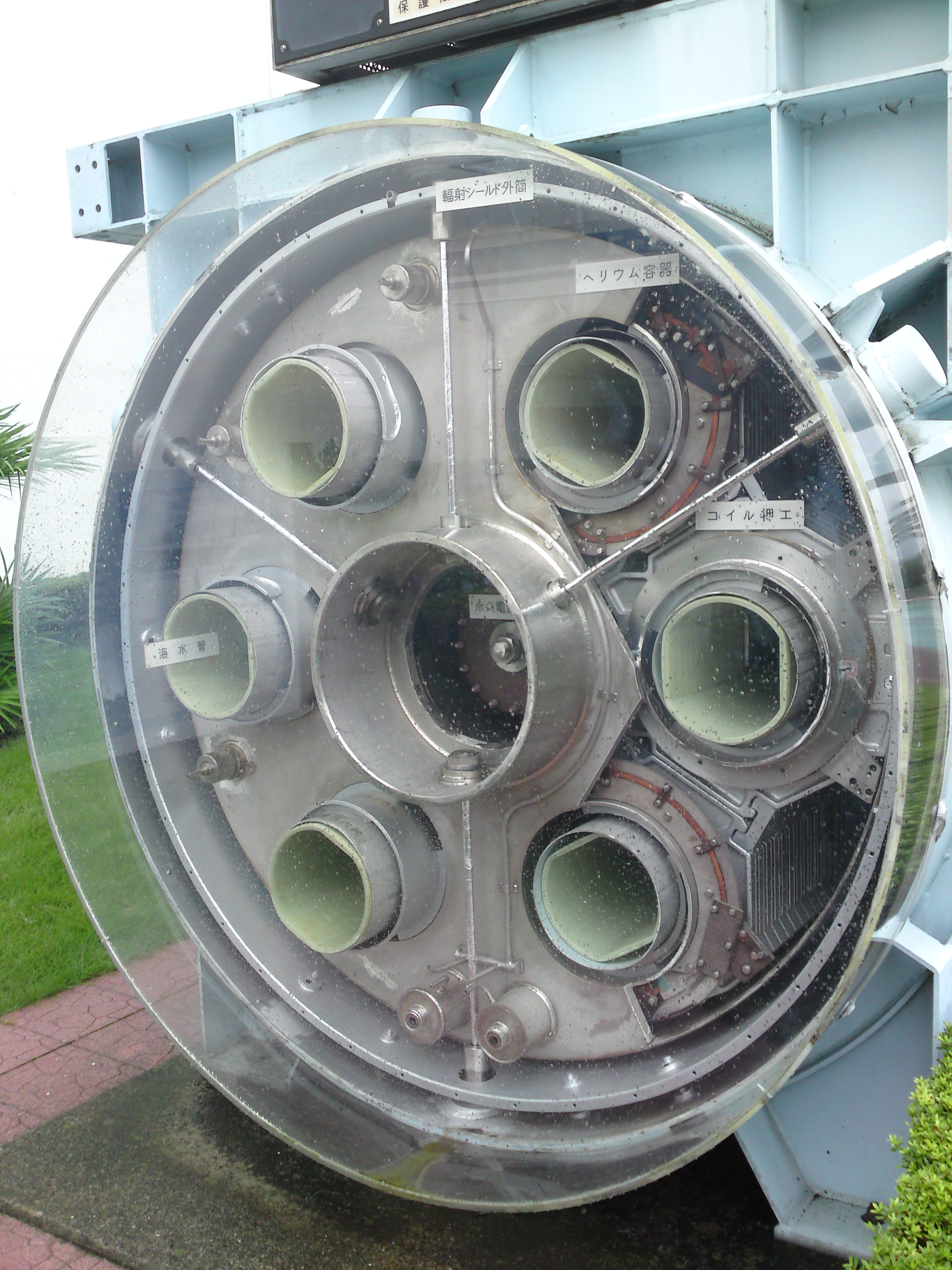
View of one end of the magnetohydrodynamic drive fitted to the vessel

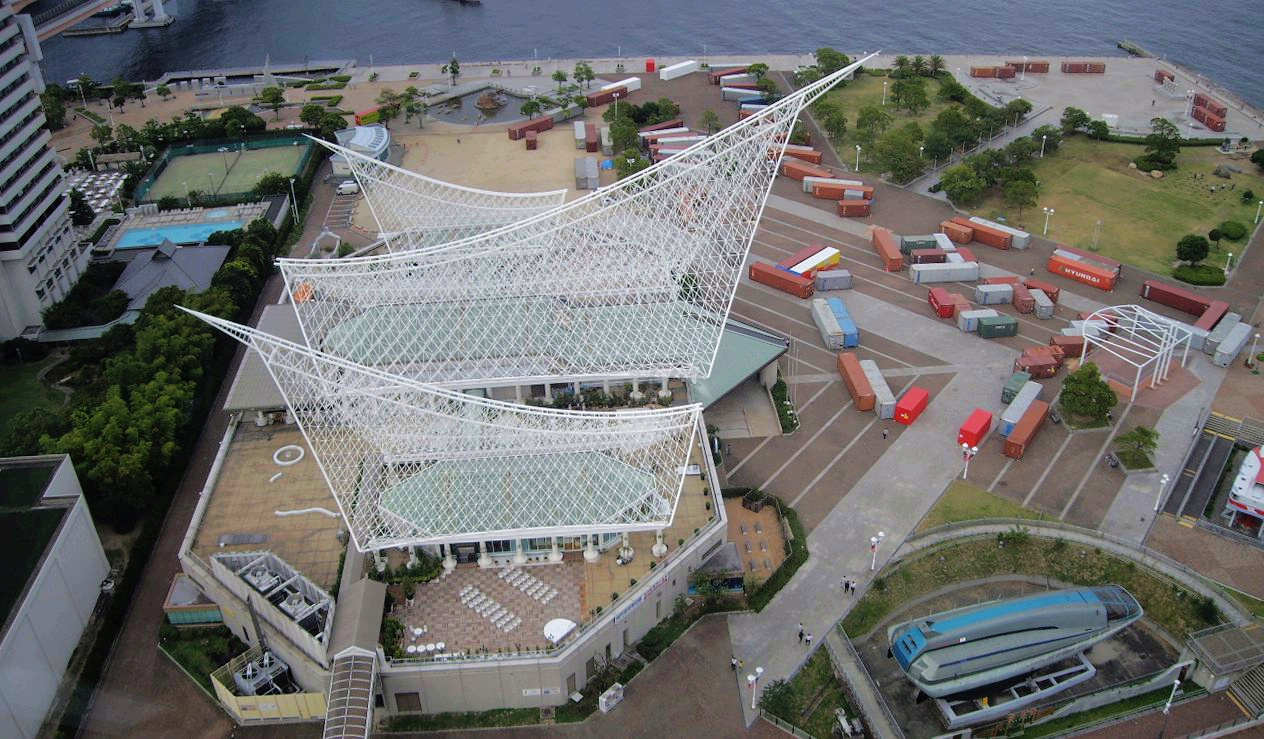
Yamato-1 in front of the Kobe Maritime Museum
