= Harborland =

Shopping district in Kobe, Japan

Coordinates: 34°40′44.6″N 135°10′54.5″E

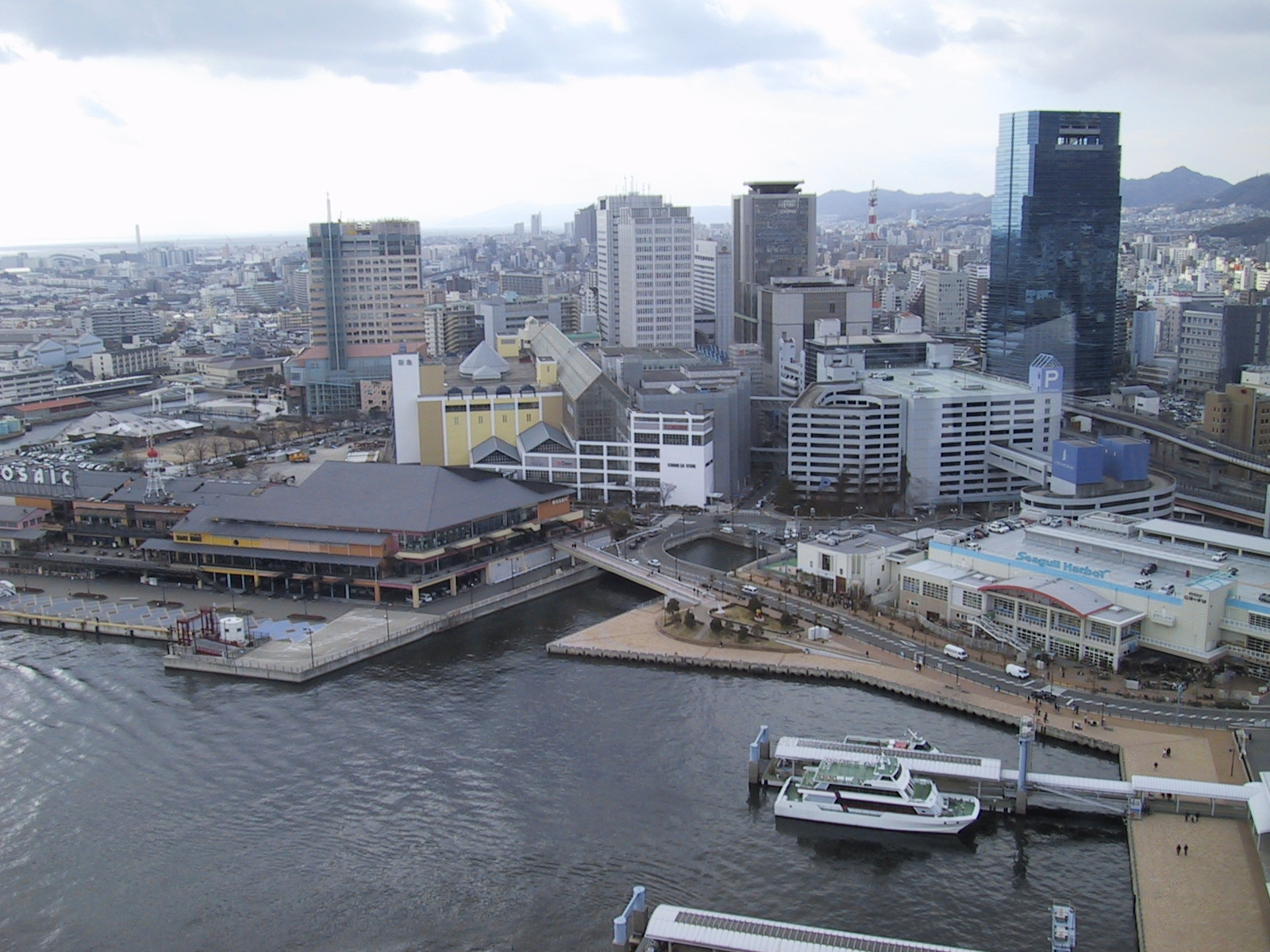
View from Kobe Port Tower

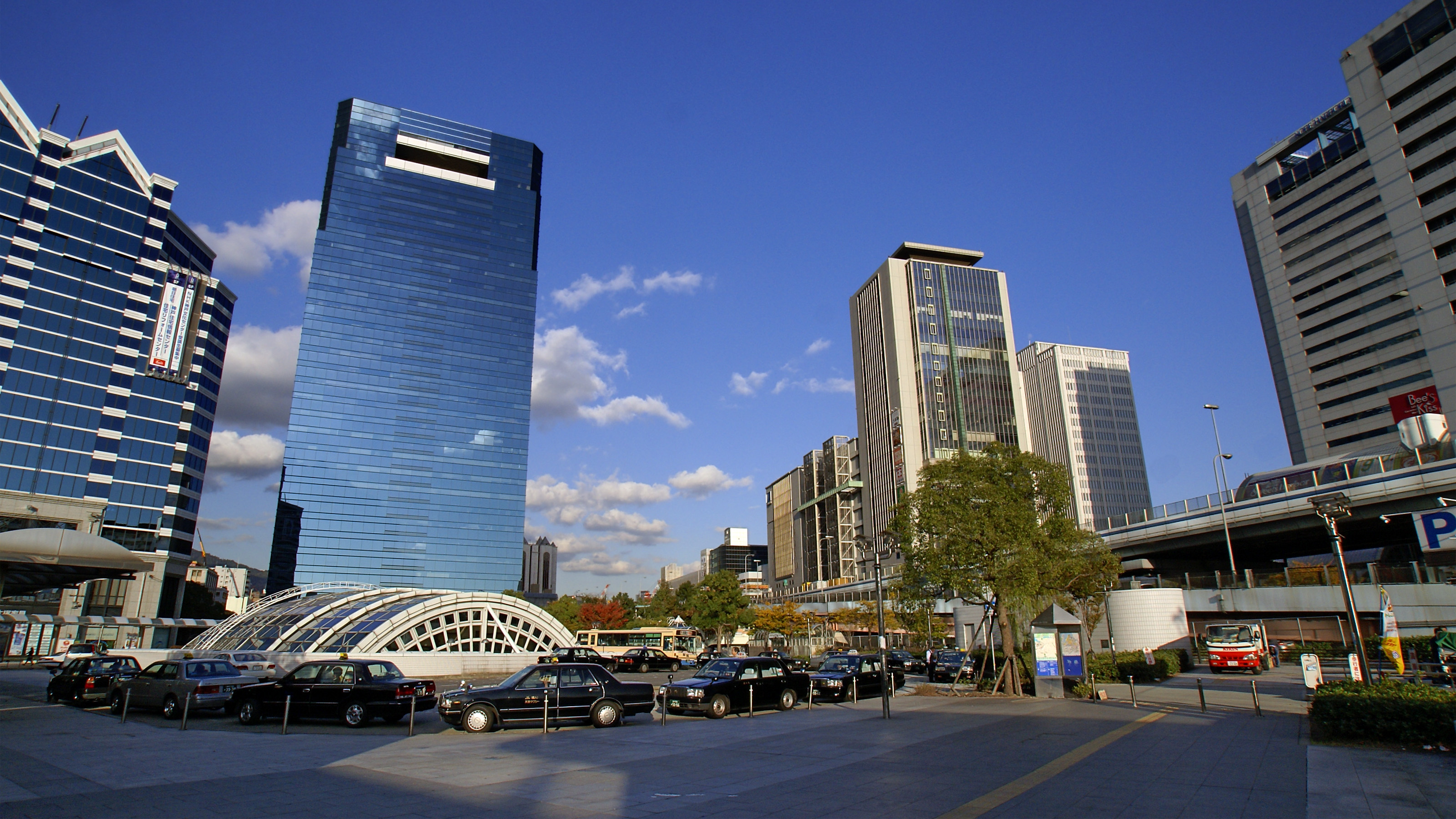
View from Kobe Station

Harborland (神戸ハーバーランド, kōbe-hābārando) is a shopping district in Chuo-ku, Kobe, Japan. Kobe Port Tower is located there.

This shopping district was made on the site of the former freight yard, Minatogawa Kamotsu Station of the Japanese National Railways. The yard was removed in 1982 and the shopping district opened in 1992.

== Access ==
- JR Kobe Station
- Kosoku Kobe Station
- Harborland Station

== See also ==
- Port of Kobe
