= Fukiai-ku =

Fukiai-ku 葺合区 ふきあいく
- Ward
- Country: Japan
- Region: Kansai
- Prefecture: Hyōgo
- City: Kobe
- Merged: December 1, 1980

Area
  - Total: 9.92 km^{2} (3.83 sq mi)

Population (1980)
  - Total: 63,516
  - Density: 6,400/km^{2} (16,600/sq mi)

Fukiai-ku (葺合区) was a ward in Kobe, Japan. It was one of seven wards established on 1 September 1931 when Kobe adopted the ward system. Its boundaries encompassed the village of Fukiai which existed prior to the formation of Kobe on 1 April 1889. On 1 December 1980 it merged with the neighbouring ward of Ikuta (生田区) to form Chuo-ku (中央区, 'central ward').

The ward was devastated by the bombing of Kobe during the Second World War. The population of the ward was reduced from 123,846 in October 1940 to only 17,914 in November 1945.

The area of the ward was 9.91 km^{2}. Its western boundary with Ikuta Ward was the old Ikuta River (now Flower Road) and its eastern border was shared with Nada Ward. The population of the ward at the 1980 national population census was 63,516.

The ward was under the jurisdiction of the Fukiai Police Station of the Hyogo Prefectural Police; this station still exists and maintains the same jurisdiction over the area, including the eastern half of Sannomiya station.
