= TOA Corporation =

Japanese electronics company

- Native name: TOA株式会社
- Company type: Public KK
- Traded as: TYO: 6809
- ISIN: JP3538600002
- Industry: Electronics
- Founded: 1934
- Headquarters: Chuo-ku, Kobe, Hyogo Prefecture 650-0046, Japan
- Area served: Worldwide
- Key people: Kenji Itani (Chairman); Kazuhiro Takeuchi (President and CEO)
- Products: Public address systems; Professional sound systems; Communications systems; Visual systems
- Revenue: ▲JPY 44.1 billion (FY 2017) (US$ 416.7 million) (FY 2017)
- Net income: ▲JPY 2.1 billion (FY 2017) (US$ 20.1 million) (FY 2017)
- Number of employees: 3,161 (consolidated, as of March 31, 2018)
- Website: Official website

TOA Corporation (TOA株式会社, Tī Ō Ē Kabushiki-gaisha) is a Japanese electronics company, specializing in public address systems, intercom systems, microphones, array speakers and megaphones. The company's products are used in a variety of settings, among them Brompton Oratory, a large neo-classical Roman Catholic church in Knightsbridge, London.

== Early history ==
The company was founded in 1934 by Tsunetaro Nakatani as the TOA Electric Manufacturing Company.
