= Port of Kobe =

Major Port in Western Japan

Coordinates: 34°40′39″N 135°13′37″E

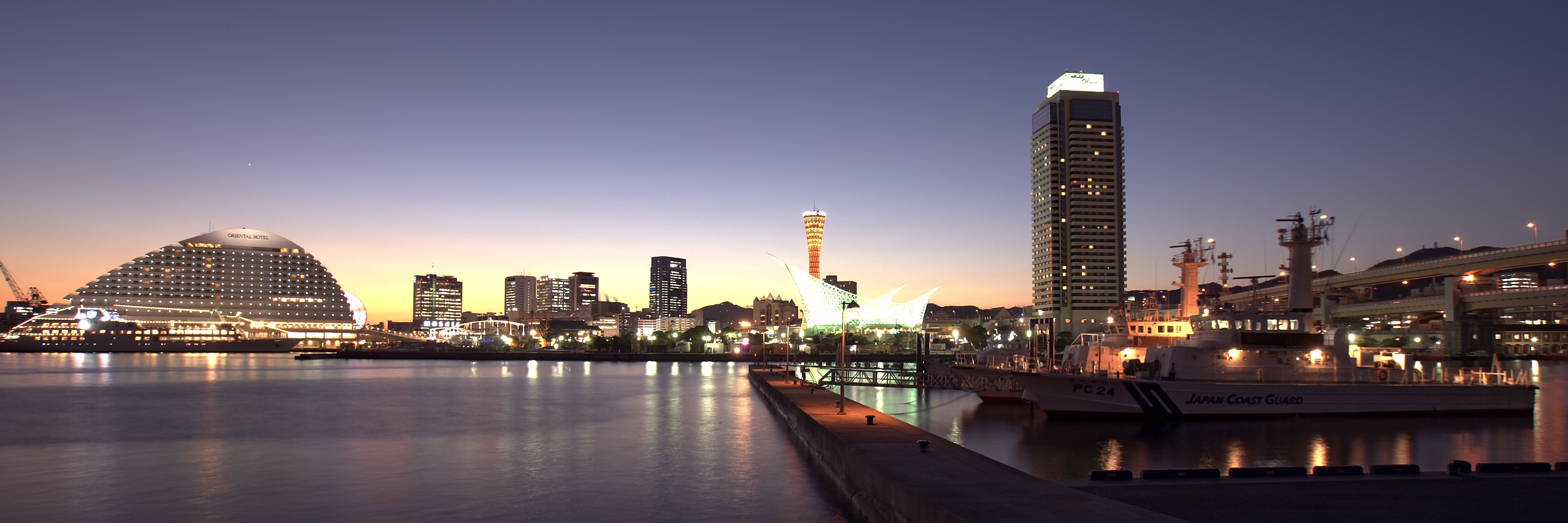
Kobe at twilight

The Port of Kobe is a Japanese maritime port in Kobe, Hyōgo in the Keihanshin area, backgrounded by the Hanshin Industrial Region.

Located at a foothill of the range of Mount Rokkō, flat lands are limited and constructions of artificial islands have carried out, to make Port Island, Rokkō Island, island of Kobe Airport to name some.

== History ==
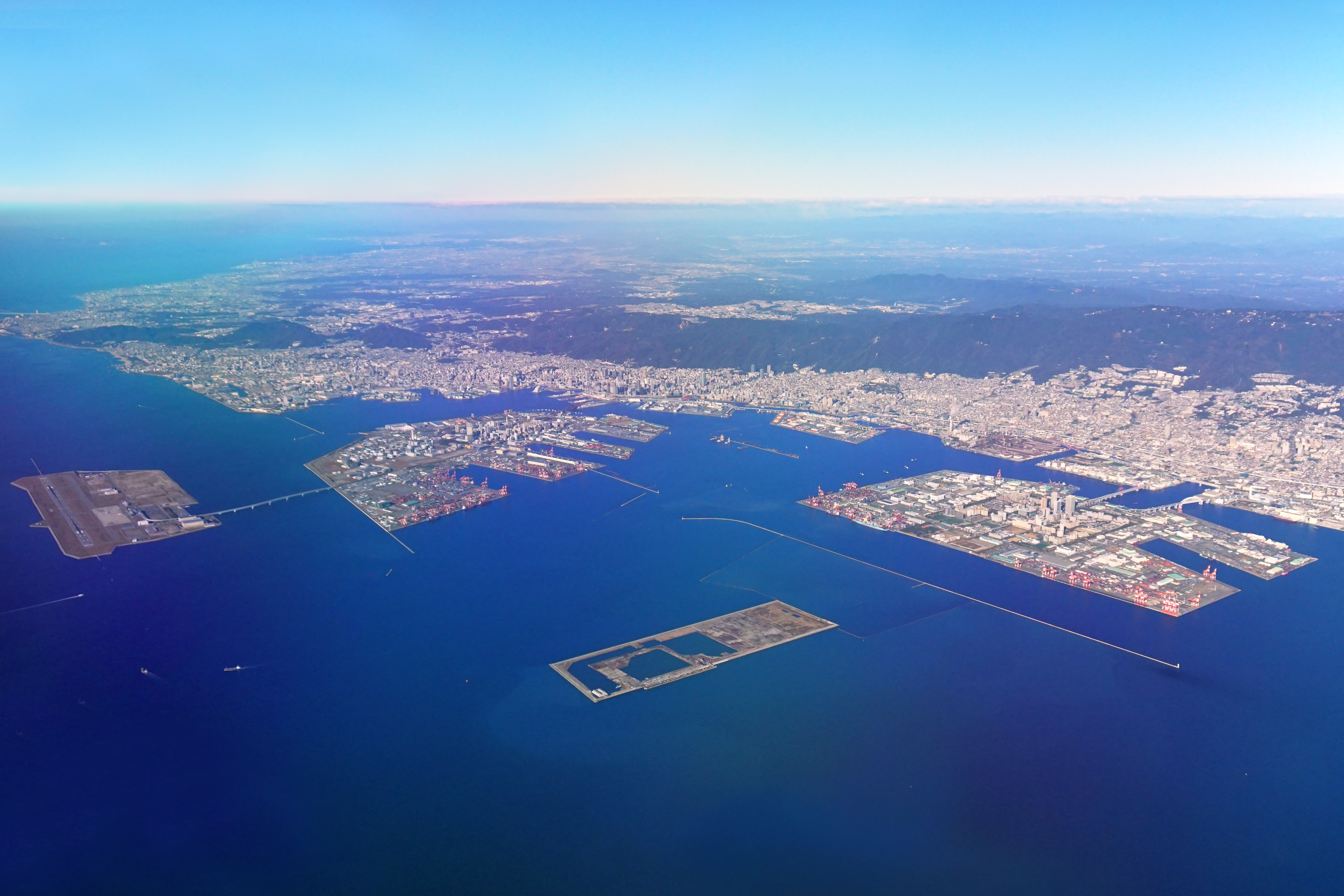
Port of Kobe from the sky

In the 12th century, Taira no Kiyomori renovated the then Ōwada no Tomari (大輪田泊) and moved to Fukuhara (福原), the short-lived capital neighbouring the port. Throughout medieval era, the port was known as Hyōgo no Tsu (兵庫津).

In 1858 the Treaty of Amity and Commerce opened the Hyōgo Port to foreigners.

In 1865, the Hyōgo Port Opening Demand Incident occurred, in which nine warships from Britain, France, the Netherlands, and the United States invaded the Hyōgo Port demanding its opening.

In 1868, a new port of Kobe was built east of the Hyōgo Port and opened.

After the World War II pillars were occupied by the Allied Forces, later by United States Forces Japan. (Last one returned in 1973.)

In the 1970s the port boasted it handled the most containers in the world. It was the world's busiest container port from 1973 to 1978.

The 1995 Great Hanshin earthquake diminished much of the port city's prominence when it destroyed and halted much of the facilities and services there, causing approximately ten trillion yen or $102.5 billion in damage, 2.5% of Japan's GDP at the time. Most of the losses were uninsured, as only 3% of property in the Kobe area was covered by earthquake insurance, compared to 16% in Tokyo. Kobe was one of the world's busiest ports prior to the earthquake, but despite the repair and rebuilding, it has never regained its former status as Japan's principal shipping port. It remains Japan's fourth busiest container port.

== Facilities ==
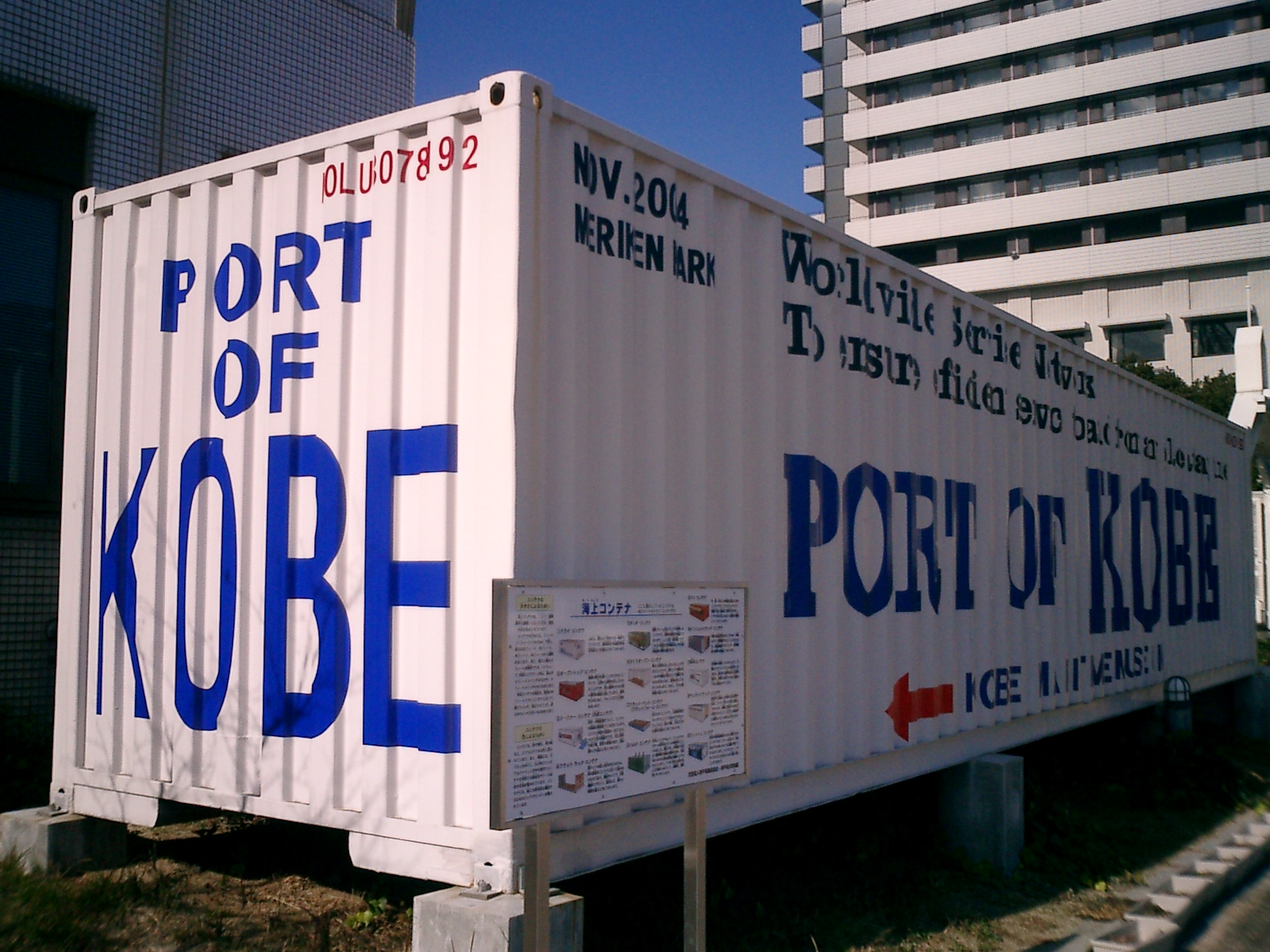
Container

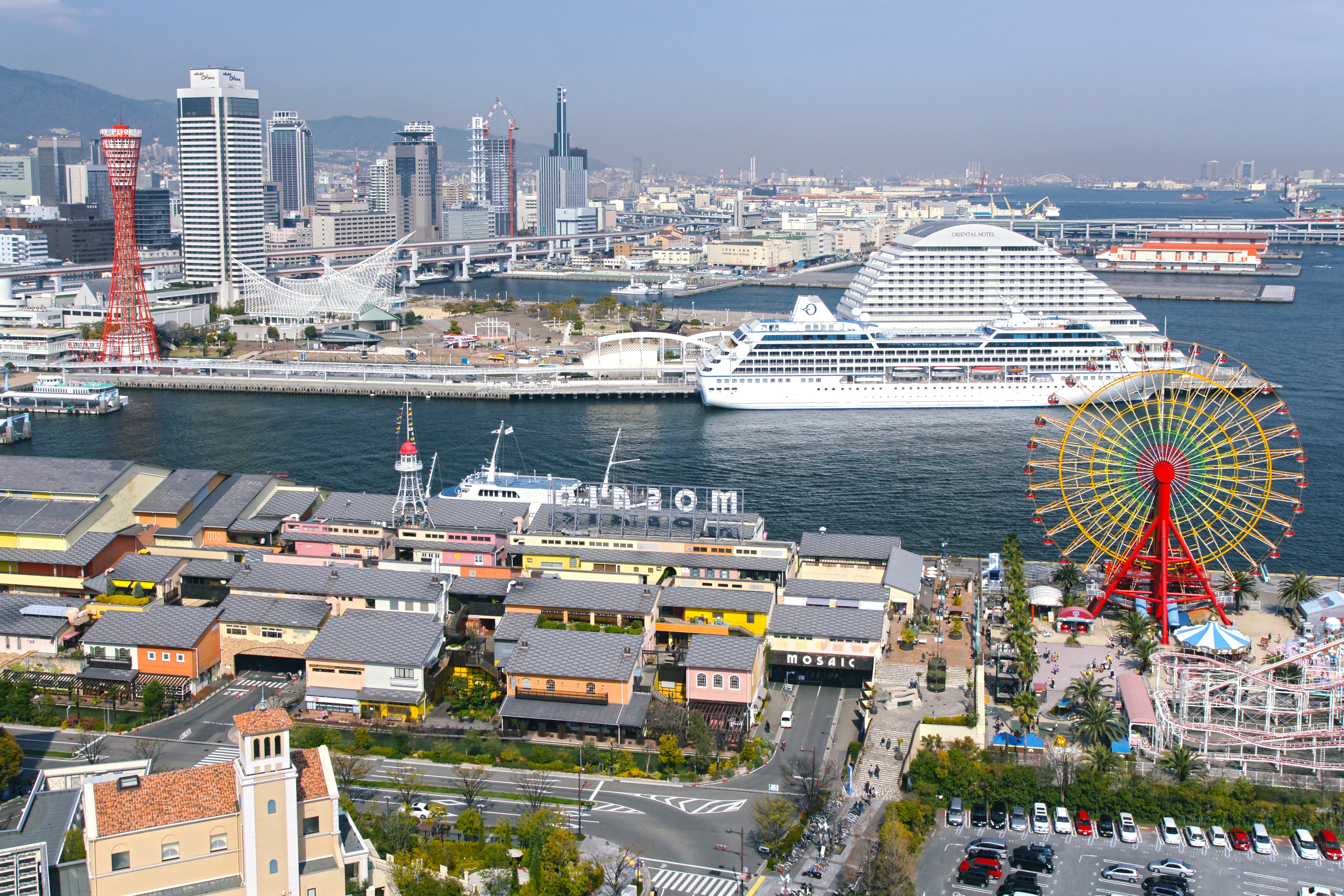
Harborland - Meriken Park area with cruise ship Nautica seen in sight.

- Container berths: 34
- Area: 3.89 km²
- Max draft: 18 m

=== Amusement facility for public ===
- Meriken Park
- Kobe Port Tower
- Harborland

== Passenger services ==
- Busan, South Korea: twice a week
- Shanghai, China: once a week
- Tianjin, China: once a week

== Cruise port ==
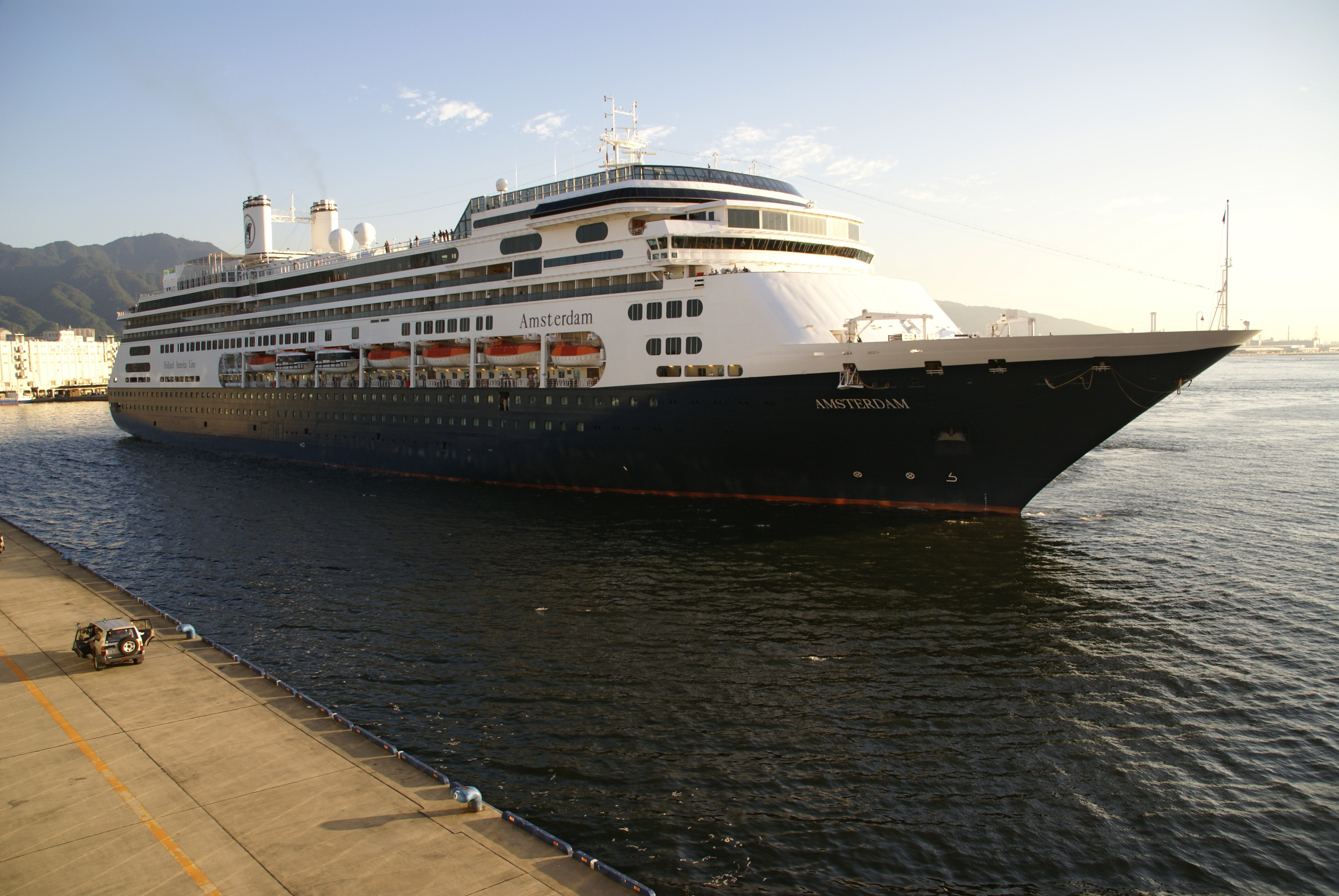
The cruise ship Amsterdam leaving Kobe

Kobe is also a home port for certain cruise ships. Cruise lines that call at the port are kinds like Holland America Line and Princess Cruise Line. In the summer of 2014 Princess expanded the market in Kobe when their ship Sun Princess sailed eight-day roundtrip Asia cruises from the port. These cruises on the Sun Princess are a part of Princess Cruises $11 billion contributions to the entire country of Japan, where the ship will also sail from Otaru, Hokkaido, as it is currently based in Yokohama, Tokyo.

== Sister ports ==
- Rotterdam port, Netherlands - 1967
- Seattle port, United States - 1967
- Tianjin port, China - 1980
- Kolkata port, India-1951
- Vancouver port, Canada-1991

== See also ==
- List of busiest container ports
- List of East Asian ports
- List of world's busiest ports by cargo tonnage
