= Kobe Port Tower =

- 神戸ポートタワー
- Kobe Port Tower

General information
- Status: Completed
- Type: Lattice tower
- Architectural style: Structural expressionism
- Location: Kobe, Japan
- Coordinates: 34°40′57.5″N 135°11′12.1″E
- Opening: 21 November 1963

Height
- Architectural: 108 m (354 ft)
- Observatory: 90.28 metres (296.2 ft)

Technical details
- Floor count: 8
- Floor area: 1,534 square metres (16,510 sq ft)

Design and construction
- Architect: Koichi Ito - Naka Takeo
- Main contractor: Obayashi Corporation

The Kobe Port Tower (神戸ポートタワー, Kōbe Pōto Tawā) is a landmark in the port city of Kobe, Japan. The sightseeing tower was completed in 1963 and was temporarily closed from late 2009 to 28 April 2010 and again from 27 September 2021 to 26 April 2024 for renovation. It is located in Chuo-ku, Kobe, Hyōgo Prefecture, Japan.

== History ==
The Kobe Port Tower was designed by the Nikken Sekkei Company and was completed in 1963.

The maintenance of the whole facility began in November 2009 and the Kobe Port Tower was closed to the public from 12 January 2010 for refurbishment. It was renovated and re-opened to the public for the sightseeing deck on 19 March 2010 but Kobe Port Tower completed the installation of 7,000 light-emitting diodes (LED) lighting equipment with 40 lighting effects starting from the re-opening day of 28 April 2010.

The facility was once again closed to the public from 27 September 2021 for renovation and seismic retrofitting. It reopened on 26 April 2024.

== Architectural features ==
The Kobe Port Tower is 108 m (354 ft) high with a total of 8 layers that is designed to look like a Tsuzumi, a Japanese drum, and it is the first tower built using a pipe lattice. The Tower is surrounded by 32 red steel staves as symbolize welcome vessels return to the shore.

== Usage ==
Kobe Port Tower has two sections; the ground floors sections and the sightseeing sections are separated and have three and five floors respectively.

At the base of the tower, the first floor is mainly to sell souvenirs and restaurants. Souvenir shops and ticket office to the sightseeing level is locating on the second floor, and third floor is the elevator exit and display floor.

For the sightseeing layers, the first floor has aerial view from the viewing area as 75 m (250 ft) above the ground. Moreover, it is observatory floor with the second floor and the rest floors are sightseeing decks. The third floor is a 360 rotate cafe with 20 minutes for a round. Fourth floor can see Awajishima and Osaka Bay and the fifth floor can see Mount Rokkō and Kansai International Airport.

== In popular culture ==
- Gamera vs. Barugon
- Ultra Seven
- Godzilla vs. SpaceGodzilla
- Ultraman Mebius & Ultraman Brothers

== See also ==
- List of towers
- Meriken Park
- Port of Kobe
- Sydney Tower
- Tokyo Tower
- Sapporo TV Tower
- Nagoya TV Tower
- Kyoto Tower
- Canton Tower
